= NP-1031 =

Clinical data
- Other names: NP1031
- Routes of administration: Unspecified
- Drug class: Oxytocin receptor modulator

NP-1031 is an oxytocin receptor modulator which is under development for the treatment of Prader–Willi syndrome. Its route of administration has not been specified. The drug has been described as an "obesity therapy". Deficient oxytocin system signaling may be present in Prader–Willi syndrome and may contribute to behavioral features such as hyperphagia and behavioral difficulties, although more research is needed in this area. NP-1031 is being developed by Novel Pharma in South Korea. As of March 2025, the drug is in the research stage of development. The chemical structure of NP-1031, and whether it is a small molecule or a peptide, do not yet appear to have been disclosed.

== See also ==
- Oxytocin receptor agonist
- List of investigational Prader–Willi syndrome drugs
- KNX-100, LIT-001, and LIT-002
