= Uterotonic =

Medication causing uterine contraction

A uterotonic, also known as an oxytocic or ecbolic, is a type of medication used to induce contraction or greater tonicity of the uterus. Uterotonics are used both to induce labor and to reduce postpartum hemorrhage.

Labor induction in the third trimester of pregnancy may be required due to medical necessity, or may be desired for social reasons. Generally, labor induction is indicated when the risk of carrying the pregnancy outweighs the risk of delivering. These reason include, but are not limited to, pregnancies that are prolonged, prelabor rupture of the fetal membranes, and concerns about the health and safety of the mother and/or child. There are multiple techniques available to stimulate uterine contractions including mechanical, pharmacological, and alternative medicine methods to initiate contractions prior to spontaneous onset of labor.

Postpartum hemorrhage, also known as PPH, is defined as a loss of 500 mL or greater of blood within 24 hours after giving birth. It is one of the leading causes of maternal mortality in women and adolescent girls worldwide, with mothers from low-resource countries being at a larger risk when compared to mothers of higher-resource countries. Occurring in 5% of all women giving birth, these situations are considered emergencies and require a quick, adequate response and the proper resources to prevent the death of the mother.

Labor and delivery is a sequential process that results in the birth of a fetus and placenta. It is dependent on maternal and fetal chemical signals to stimulate muscles in the uterus to contract and relax. Of such signals include prostaglandins and oxytocin. Uterotonics can be utilized in these chemical pathways in order to medically stimulate contractions in labor induction or to treat postpartum hemorrhage.

== Types ==
Types of Uterotonic drugs with pertinent drug information adapted from Obstetric Anesthesiology.
Utertonic	Administration	Onset	Duration of Action	Common Side Effects	Contraindications
Oxytocin	IV Bolus IV continuous infusion Intramuscularly (IM)	IV: < 1 min IM: 3-5 min	IV: 20 min IM: 30-90 min	IV: Hypotension, tachycardia, arrhythmia IM: Nausea and Vomiting	IV: Hypotension IM: Hemodynamically unstable
Carbetocin	IV bolus IM	IV & IM: 2 min	IV: 60 min IM: 120 min	IV: Hypotension, tachycardia, arrhythmia IM: Nausea and Vomiting	IV: Hypotension IM: Hemodynamically unstable
Misoprostol	Oral (PO) Sublingual (SL) Vaginal (PV) Rectal (PR)	PO: 8 min SL:11 min PV: 20 min PR: 100 min	PO: 120 min SL: 180 min PV: 240 min PR: 240 min	Fever Diarrhea Nausea Vomiting	
Carboprost	IM Intramyometrial (IMM)	IM: 3-5 min IMM: No data	IM: 60-120 min IMM: No data	IM: Bronchospasm IMM: Nausea, vomiting, shivering	IM: Asthma IMM: Caution in liver, kidney or heart disease.
Ergometrine	IV IM	IV: < 1 min IM: 2-3 min	IV: 45 min IM: 3 hours	IV: Hypertension IM: Nausea and Vomiting	IV: Hypertension IM: Myocardial Ischemia
Methylergonovine	IV IM	IV: < 1 min IM: 2-3 min	IV: 45 min IM: 3 hours	IV: Hypertension IM: Nausea and Vomiting	IV: Hypertension IM: Myocardial Ischemia

=== Oxytocin ===
Oxytocin is a peptide hormone produced in the hypothalamus that plays an important role in many physiological functions. These functions include, enhancing mood and social relationships, promotion of maternal behaviors and stimulations of uterine contractions, among others roles. Uterine muscle contractions are induced via a G-protein pathway stemming from the oxytocin receptor (OXTR), the binding and activation site of oxytocin. When oxytocin binds to its associated receptors in the uterus, a cascade is initiated that results in an increase in calcium and subsequently an increase in muscle contractions. The release of oxytocin helps to facilitate stronger contractions during labor to aid in delivery of the fetus. Additionally, during pregnancy, the uterine muscles have an increased concentration of oxytocin receptors, leading to an increased response to oxytocin as well.

==== Role in labor induction ====
Oxytocin is the most commonly used agent for labor induction. It is given intravenously since it is easily degraded by the body if given orally. While giving oxytocin, it is important to monitor the mother and the fetus, specifically the mother's uterine activity and the fetal heart rate. The more common side effects of oxytocin include tachysystole, hyponatremia, and hypotension. Tachysystole is an increased rate of uterine contractions. If this occurs, it can be managed by lowering the dosage of oxytocin. Hyponatremia is a decreased concentration of sodium in the body as a result of increased fluids. This occurs due to oxytocin's similar structure to vasopressin (antidiuretic hormone), which acts to retain water in the body. Hypotension, or low blood pressure, is also a common side effect due to oxytocin's ability to relax smooth muscle of vessels. In comparison to women in spontaneous labor, women in induced labor on oxytocin experience a longer latent phase, however the duration of labor after reaching active labor (when the cervix has reached 6 cm), the duration of labor is considered equal.

==== Role in postpartum hemorrhage ====
The most common cause of postpartum hemorrhage is a loss of muscle tone in the uterus. Normally, the uterus will contract to constrict blood vessels and decrease the flow of blood to prevent bleeding out. However, if there is a loss of muscle tone, see uterine atony, there is an increased risk of bleeding. Oxytocin is the first-line pharmacological step to help prevent PPH and treat PPH.

=== Analogs ===
Oxytocin plays an integral role in regulation of many of the body's biological processes- especially labor regulation. Since its structure was revealed in 1953, it has been the subject of intensive research. Some of the analogs produced from extensive modification of its chemical structure residues have produced drugs and therapies that are utilized as uterotonics. Similar to oxytocin, analogues bind to oxytocin receptors found along the muscles of the uterus and act as an agonist. During pregnancy, the number of oxytocin receptors increase until reaching their peak near completion of the pregnancy. An important note is that not all analogs of oxytocin work as a receptor agonist or as a uterotonic. Some may oppose uterine contractility such as atosiban.

==== Carbetocin ====
Carbetocin: A long-acting synthetic analog with a half-life 4 to 10 times longer than natural oxytocin, it is used to control postpartum hemorrhaging or bleeding after giving birth. Heat-stable carbetocin does not require refrigeration unlike oxytocin; a notable advantage for use in low medical resource areas. It is approved for use in 23 various countries around the world (not approved in United States). In Canadian and German guidelines, carbetocin is recommended as a first-line therapy treatment for post-partum hemorrhaging with notable efficacy when used with cesarean section deliveries. Carbetocin has been shown to be more effective than oxytocin in preventing postpartum hemorrhaging as well. Common side effects of carbetocin include vomiting, fever, and hypertension- similar side effect profile to that of oxytocin. Both carbetocin and oxytocin are listed on the World Health Organization's Essential Medicines List.

Demoxytocin is another analog of oxytocin which is also used to induce labor.

=== Prostaglandins ===
Prostaglandins are derived from the cell membrane phospholipids through a series of enzymatic reactions. Phospholipase A_{2} cleaves arachidonic acid from membrane phospholipids and is eventually converted to prostaglandins by cyclooxygenase-1 (COX-1) and cyclooxygenase-2 (COX-2). Due to this mechanism, prostaglandins have a presence in many areas of the body and allow for diverse physiological and pathological functions. Prostaglandins are primarily known for their role in mediating inflammation, contributing to symptoms such as pain, swelling, redness, and warmth. Prostaglandin synthesis is thus a target for many drugs. Inhibition of COX-1 and COX-2 by aspirin and non-steroidal anti-inflammatory drugs prevents the inflammatory response and can also prevent homeostatic functions of the stomach and GI system that may lead to ulcers and bleeding.

Prostaglandins (PGs) have been attributed to partaking in the mechanisms of uterine activity during labor. The presence of PGs and PG receptors increases throughout the pregnancy, and PGs increase expression of oxytocin receptors as well. Along with the increase in oxytocin receptors to facilitate labor, PGs also increase the intracellular concentration of calcium. Two PG subtypes, E and F, play fundamental roles in labor. PGE receptors, activated by PGE_{1} and PGE_{2}, are more uteroselective and will stimulate contraction or relaxation depending on the subtype. PGF receptors will stimulate myometrial contraction, although the stimulus from PGF receptors are inferior to oxytocin. For this reason, injectable PGs are not used as first-line treatment. Adverse effects of injectable PGs include hypotension and pulmonary edema.

==== Misoprostol ====
Misoprostol is an analogue of PGE_{1} and is a popular choice for PPH prophylaxis and treatment. Misoprostol is easily administered, considered safe, and is low-cost. The routes of administration include sublingual, oral, vaginal, and rectal, with greatest efficacy from sublingual and vaginal administration. Vaginally administered misoprostol had improved outcomes of inducing labor within twenty-four hours compared to oxytocin, but was associated with uterine hyperstimulation. Misoprostol is an agonist of EP_{1} and EP_{3} receptors, and can cause a greater stimulation at lower concentrations. At higher concentrations, the medication can suppress contractions.

==== Carboprost ====
Carboprost is an analogue of PGF_{2α} and contains oxytocic properties that permit a longer duration of action than the naturally occurring prostaglandins. The injectable prostaglandin is administered intramuscularly or intramyometrially, and is used in clinical practice. The drug is contraindicated in those with reactive airway diseases. Side effects of this medication include hypertension, hypotension, pulmonary hypertension, vomiting and diarrhea.

==== Other prostaglandin analogues ====
- Alprostadil is commonly known as PGE_{1} and is a naturally occurring prostaglandin and vasodilator. Alprostadil has not been added to the guidelines to treat PPH. The medication is not indicated for inducing labor, PPH, nor women, but for erectile dysfunction.
- Dinoprostone is commonly known as PGE_{2} and has the ability to stimulate both contractility and relaxation in the uterus during pregnancy. The area of action differs for each effect, contraction occurs in the upper uterine segment while relaxation occurs in the lower uterine segment. It is not as efficacious for inducing labor when compared to other prostaglandins.
- Dinoprost is also known as PGF_{2α} and is a naturally occurring prostaglandin which causes contraction via PGF receptors. Dinoprost was discontinued in 2015.

=== Ergot alkaloids ===
Ergot Alkaloids refer to a set of medications derived from the rye ergot fungus with mixed receptor activity that work to increase uterine muscle tone. Unlike oxytocinergic uterotonics, ergot alkaloids work primarily through agonistic activity of serotonin receptors along the smooth muscles of the uterine wall.

==== Ergometrine ====
Ergometrine, also known as ergonovine. Ergometrine is the first drug to be isolated from the rye ergot fungus. Ergometrine is often used alongside oxytocin to treat postpartum hemorrhaging and has been found to more effective than the standard of oxytocin treatment alone. Ergometrine has a relatively quick onset of action following intravenous administration (one minute) with the duration of action averaging 45 minutes (rhythmic contracts will persist for up to 3 hours following administration).

==== Methylergonovine ====
Methylergonovine, a synthetic analog of ergometrine that is primarily used to treat postpartum hemorrhaging due to uterine atony. Similar to ergometrine, methylergonovine works through agonism of the serotonin receptors found on the smooth muscles of the uterine wall. It has partial agonist activity on α-adrenergic receptors as well as weak antagonistic activity on dopamine receptors. Methylergonovine is intravenously administered with onset and duration of action similar to that of ergometrine. Its most common side effect is hypertension. Methylergonovine is recommended as a second-line therapy in treating postpartum hemorrhaging due to uterine atony according to both the American College of Obstetricians and Gynecologists (ACOG) and the Royal College of Obstetrics and Gynecology. In 2012, ACOG published a warning regarding use of methylergonovine's usage in people with hypertension where it was suspected to have caused myocardial infarction and ischemia in those individuals.
