= Oxytocin receptor =

Genes on human chromosome 3

OXTR

Identifiers
- Aliases: OXTR, OT-R, oxytocin receptor
- External IDs: OMIM: 167055; MGI: 109147; GeneCards: OXTR

Gene location (Mouse)
Chr.	Chromosome 6 (mouse)
Band	6|6 E3	Start	112,450,644 bp
Band	6|6 E3	End	112,466,904 bp
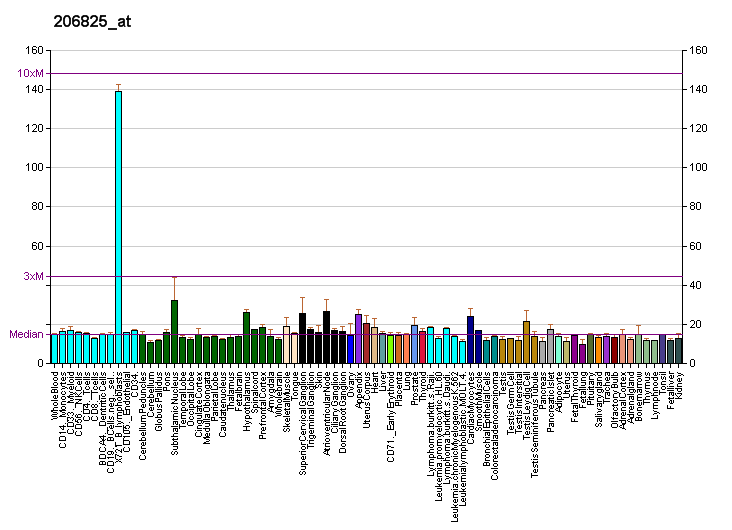
RNA expression pattern
Bgee	Human / Mouse (ortholog); n/a / Top expressed in: mammary gland; lumbar subsegment of spinal cord; cervix; white adipose tissue; islet of Langerhans; ciliary body; pineal gland; mesenteric lymph nodes; dentate gyrus of hippocampal formation granule cell; adrenal gland
BioGPS	More reference expression data
Gene ontology
Molecular function	G protein-coupled receptor activity; peptide binding; signal transducer activity; peptide hormone binding; vasopressin receptor activity; oxytocin receptor activity
Cellular component	integral component of membrane; membrane; plasma membrane; integral component of plasma membrane; intracellular anatomical structure; microvillus; apical plasma membrane
Biological process	response to cocaine; positive regulation of synapse assembly; positive regulation of norepinephrine secretion; response to cytokine; maternal process involved in parturition; response to estradiol; muscle contraction; response to anoxia; response to organic cyclic compound; eating behavior; ejaculation; estrous cycle; positive regulation of cytosolic calcium ion concentration; response to progesterone; response to amphetamine; ERK1 and ERK2 cascade; regulation of systemic arterial blood pressure by vasopressin; response to steroid hormone; response to peptide hormone; negative regulation of gastric acid secretion; memory; positive regulation of synaptic transmission, GABAergic; response to peptide; development of the heart; cell surface receptor signaling pathway; telencephalon development; sleep; cellular response to hormone stimulus; positive regulation of blood pressure; positive regulation of synaptic transmission, glutamatergic; Maternal behavior; positive regulation of vasoconstriction; social behavior; positive regulation of penile erection; lactation; digestive tract development; regulation of digestive system process; signal transduction; positive regulation of uterine smooth muscle contraction; suckling behavior; female pregnancy; G protein-coupled receptor signaling pathway; positive regulation of cold-induced thermogenesis
Sources:Amigo / QuickGO
Orthologs
Databases	NCBI: entry; OMA: entry
Species	Human	Mouse
Entrez	5021	18430
Ensembl	ENSG00000180914	ENSMUSG00000049112
UniProt	P30559	P97926
RefSeq (mRNA)	NM_000916	NM_001081147
RefSeq (protein)	NP_000907; NP_001341582; NP_001341583; NP_001341584; NP_001341585	NP_001074616
Location (UCSC)	n/a	Chr 6: 112.45 – 112.47 Mb
PubMed search
- Wikidata
View/Edit Human	View/Edit Mouse

The oxytocin receptor, also known as OXTR, is a protein which functions as receptor for the hormone and neurotransmitter oxytocin. In humans, the oxytocin receptor is encoded by the OXTR gene which has been localized to human chromosome 3p25.

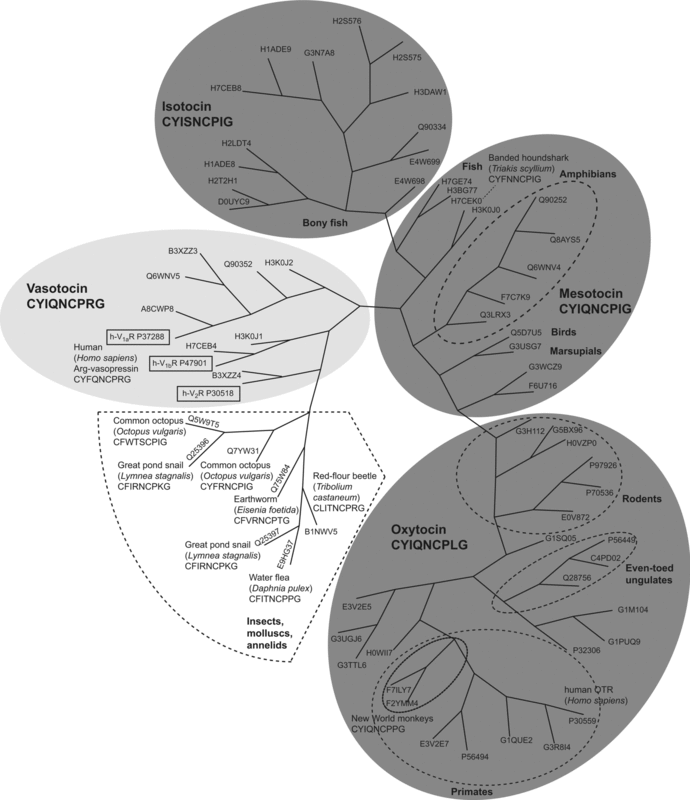
Evolutionary tree of the oxytocin, vasotocin, mesotocin, and isotocin receptors and their ligands. From Koechbach et al.

== Function and location ==
The OXTR protein belongs to the G protein-coupled receptor (GPCR) family, specifically G_{q}, and acts as a receptor for oxytocin. Its activity is mediated by G proteins that activate several different second messenger systems.

Oxytocin receptors are expressed by the myoepithelial cells of the mammary gland, and in both the myometrium and endometrium of the uterus at the end of pregnancy. The oxytocin receptor system plays an important role as an inducer of uterine contractions during parturition and of milk ejection.

OXTR is also associated with the central nervous system. The gene is believed to play a major role in social, cognitive, and emotional behavior. A decrease in OXTR expression by methylation of the OXTR gene is associated with callous and unemotional traits in adolescence, rigid thinking in anorexia nervosa, problems with facial and emotional recognition, and difficulties in the affect regulation. A reduction in this gene is believed to lead to prenatal stress, postnatal depression, and social anxiety. Studies on OXTR methylation—which downregulates oxytocin mechanisms—suggest this process is associated with increased gray matter density in the amygdala, implicating OXTR regulation in stress and parasympathetic regulation.

Social isolation has been found to decrease oxytocin receptor levels in rodents, whereas levels of oxytocin were unchanged. The decreased oxytocin receptor levels were associated with behavioral changes including increased aggression and anxiety-like behavior, hyperactivity, and diminished social behaviors and memory. Exogenous administration of oxytocin receptor agonists like oxytocin or TGOT was able to partially reverse the behavioral changes.

Fecal microbiota transplant from people with social anxiety disorder into rodents caused selective social anxiety-like symptoms in the rodents. This was associated with brain oxytocinergic abnormalities, including decreased expression of the oxytocin receptor. Lactobacillus reuteri has been found to increase oxytocinergic signaling in rodents, with its metabolite ergothioneine reducing social avoidance behavior. Conversely, propionic acid (propionate), which is produced by certain gut bacteria and is increased by social isolation, has been found to induce social deficits and anxiety in rodents, with this being associated with decreased oxytocin receptor expression.

In some mammals, oxytocin receptors are also found in the kidney and heart.

=== Mesolimbic dopamine pathways ===
The oxytocinergic circuit projecting from the paraventricular hypothalamic nucleus (PVN) innervates the ventral tegmental area (VTA) dopaminergic neurons that project to the nucleus accumbens, i.e., the mesolimbic pathway. Activation of the PVN→VTA projection by oxytocin affects sexual, social, and addictive behavior via this link to the mesolimbic pathway; specifically, oxytocin exerts a prosexual and prosocial effect in this region.

== Polymorphism ==
The receptors for oxytocin (OXTR) have genetic differences with varied effects on individual behavior. The polymorphism (rs53576) occurs on the third intron of OXTR in three types: GG, AG, AA. The GG allele is connected with oxytocin levels in humans. A-allele carriers are associated with more sensitivity to stress, lower social proficiency, and more mental health issues than the GG carriers.

In a study looking at empathy and stress, individuals with the allele GG scored higher than A-carrier individuals in a "Reading the Mind in the Eyes" test. GG carriers, with their naturally higher levels of oxytocin, were better able to distinguish between emotions. A-allele carriers responded with more stress to stressful situations than GG-allele carriers. A-allele carriers had lower scores on psychological resources, like optimism, mastery, and self-esteem, than GG individuals when measured with factor analysis for depressive symptomology and psychological resources, along with the Beck Depression Inventory. A-allele carriers had higher depressive symptomology and lower psychological resources than GG individuals. A-allele individuals scored lower in human sociality than GG people on a Tridimensional Personality Questionnaire. AA individuals had the lowest amygdala activation while processing emotionally salient information and those with GG had the highest activity when tested using BOLD during an fMRI. On the other hand, variations at the CD38 rs3796863 and OXTR rs53576 loci were not associated with psychosocial characteristics of adolescents assessed with the Strengths and Difficulties Questionnaire (SDQ); in studies with a similar design, authors recommend replication with larger samples and greater power to detect small effects, especially in age–sex subgroups of adolescents.

The frequency of the A allele varies among ethnic groups, being significantly more common among East Asians than Europeans.

Some evidence suggests an association between OXTR gene polymorphism, IQ, and autism spectrum disorder (ASD). Studies have done research focusing on variants in the third intron of the gene, a region that is strongly correlated with personality traits and ASD. OXTR knockout mice have shown abnormal behaviors such as social impairments and aggressiveness. These abnormalities can be reduced with oxytocin or oxytocin receptor agonist administration. Overall, the study suggests that rare variants are considerably more abundant in individuals with ASD compared to that of healthy individuals, however further research with larger sample sizes is needed.

== Ligands ==
Several selective ligands for the oxytocin receptor have been developed, but close similarity between the oxytocin and related vasopressin receptors make it difficult to achieve high selectivity with peptide derivatives. However the search for a druggable, non-peptide template has led to several potent, highly selective, orally bioavailable oxytocin receptor antagonists. Oxytocin receptor agonists have also been developed.

=== Agonists ===
==== Peptide ====
- Carbetocin
- Demoxytocin
- Lipo-oxytocin-1 (LOT-1)
- Merotocin (FE-202767)
- Oxytocin
- PF-06655075 (PF1; ASK1476)
- TGOT
- Vasotocin

==== Non-peptide ====
- CA7 – among smallest-known oxytocin receptor agonists; considerable selectivity over the vasopressin V_{1A} receptor
- KNX-200 (KNX200) – series; chemical structure(s) not yet disclosed
- LIT-001 — improved social deficits in mice; non-selective over vasopressin receptors
- LIT-002 – extremely potent; improved social deficits in mice; non-selective over vasopressin receptors
- TC OT 39 – non-selective over vasopressin receptors
- WAY-267,464 – anxiolytic in mice; possibly non-selective over vasopressin receptors
- WJ0679 – among smallest-known oxytocin receptor agonists; produces prosocial effects in rodents

==== Unknown ====
- NP-1031

=== Antagonists ===
==== Peptide ====
- Atosiban
- Barusiban
- Tocinoic acid

==== Non-peptide ====
- Cligosiban – potent, highly selective, centrally active
- Epelsiban – peripherally selective
- L-368,899
- L-371,257 – peripherally selective (i.e. poor blood–brain barrier penetration, few central effects)
- L-372,662
- Nolasiban (OBE001; RPN-002; erlosiban)
- Retosiban (GSK-221,149)
- SSR-126768
- WAY-162720 – centrally active following peripheral administration

=== Positive allosteric modulators ===
- KNX-300/400 (KNX300/400)

=== Indirect agonists ===
- KNX-100 (KNX100; SOC-1)
- KNX-101 (KNX101)

== See also ==
- Oxytocin deficiency
