= Lipo-oxytocin-1 =

Chemical compound

Clinical data
- Other names: LOT-1
- Drug class: Oxytocin receptor agonist
- ATC code: None

Identifiers
- IUPAC name: [4-[[7-(2-amino-2-oxoethyl)-4-[2-[[1-[(2-amino-2-oxoethyl)amino]-4-methyl-1-oxopentan-2-yl]carbamoyl]pyrrolidine-1-carbonyl]-10-(3-amino-3-oxopropyl)-13-butan-2-yl-19-(hexadecanoylamino)-6,9,12,15,18-pentaoxo-1,2-dithia-5,8,11,14,17-pentazacycloicos-16-yl]methyl]phenyl] hexadecanoate
- CAS Number: 1852481-24-3
- PubChem CID: 156963489

Chemical and physical data
- Formula: C_{75}H_{126}N_{12}O_{14}S_{2}
- Molar mass: 1484.02 g·mol^{−1}
- 3D model (JSmol): Interactive image
- SMILES: CCCCCCCCCCCCCCCC(=O)NC1CSSCC(NC(=O)C(NC(=O)C(NC(=O)C(NC(=O)C(NC1=O)CC2=CC=C(C=C2)OC(=O)CCCCCCCCCCCCCCC)C(C)CC)CCC(=O)N)CC(=O)N)C(=O)N3CCCC3C(=O)NC(CC(C)C)C(=O)NCC(=O)N
- InChI: InChI=1S/C75H126N12O14S2/c1-7-10-12-14-16-18-20-22-24-26-28-30-32-36-65(91)80-59-49-102-103-50-60(75(100)87-44-34-35-61(87)73(98)84-56(45-51(4)5)68(93)79-48-64(78)90)85-70(95)58(47-63(77)89)83-69(94)55(42-43-62(76)88)81-74(99)67(52(6)9-3)86-71(96)57(82-72(59)97)46-53-38-40-54(41-39-53)101-66(92)37-33-31-29-27-25-23-21-19-17-15-13-11-8-2/h38-41,51-52,55-61,67H,7-37,42-50H2,1-6H3,(H2,76,88)(H2,77,89)(H2,78,90)(H,79,93)(H,80,91)(H,81,99)(H,82,97)(H,83,94)(H,84,98)(H,85,95)(H,86,96); Key:SEKXRJKQJZKAIR-UHFFFAOYSA-N

Lipo-oxytocin-1 (LOT-1) is a synthetic peptide and derivative of oxytocin that acts as an agonist of the oxytocin receptor. The lipidation strategy was applied to oxytocin to create a new peptide with improved pharmacokinetics. LOT-1 consists of oxytocin conjugated with two palmitoyl groups. After adjusting for molecular weight (LOT-1 is ~1.5x the weight of oxytocin), oxytocin and LOT-1 are equipotent. In addition, LOT-1 appears to have a significantly longer duration of effect relative to that of oxytocin. It has yet to be determined whether LOT-1 possesses improved blood-brain-barrier permeability relative to oxytocin.

== See also ==
- Oxytocin receptor agonist
- Carbetocin
- Demoxytocin
- Merotocin
- Palmitoylation
