= Social isolation =

Lack of contact between an individual and society

Social isolation is a state of complete or near-complete lack of contact between an individual and society. It differs from loneliness, which reflects temporary and involuntary lack of contact with other humans in the world. Social isolation can be an issue for individuals of any age, though symptoms may differ by age group.

Social isolation has similar characteristics in both temporary instances and for those with a historical lifelong isolation cycle. All types of social isolation can include staying home for lengthy periods of time; having no communication with family, acquaintances or friends; or willfully avoiding any contact with other humans when those opportunities do arise.

== Effects ==
True social isolation over years and decades can be a chronic condition affecting all aspects of a person's well-being. Social isolation can often lead to feelings of loneliness, fear of others (agoraphobia), or negative self-esteem. Lack of consistent human contact can also cause conflict with (peripheral) friends. Socially isolated people may occasionally also cause problems with family members.

The magnitude of risk associated with social isolation is comparable with that of cigarette smoking and other major biomedical and psychosocial risk factors. However, our understanding of how and why social isolation is risky for health – or conversely – how and why social ties and relationships are protective of health, still remains quite limited.

— James S. House, Psychosomatic Medicine, 2001, Issue 2, Volume 63, pages 273–274

In the case of mood-related isolation, the individual may isolate during a depressive episode only to reappear when their mood improves. The individual may attempt to justify their reclusive or isolating behavior as enjoyable or comfortable. There can be an inner realization on the part of the individual that there is something wrong with their isolating responses which can lead to heightened anxiety. Relationships can be a struggle, as the individual may reconnect with others during a healthier mood only to return to an isolated state during a subsequent low or depressed mood.

== Perceived social isolation in humans ==
Research indicates that perceived social isolation (PSI) is a risk factor for and may contribute to "poorer overall cognitive performance and poorer executive functioning, faster cognitive decline, more negative and depressive cognition, heightened sensitivity to social threats, and a self-protective confirmatory bias in social cognition." PSI also contributes to accelerating the ageing process: Wilson et al. (2007) reported that, after controlling for social network size and frequency of social activity, perceived social isolation is predictive of cognitive decline and risk for Alzheimer's disease. Moreover, the social interactions of individuals who feel socially isolated are often more negative and less subjectively satisfying. This can contribute to a vicious cycle in which the person becomes more and more isolated.

=== Neuroimaging studies ===
In the first resting state fMRI functional connectivity (FC) study on PSI, PSI was found to be associated with increased resting-state FC between several nodes of the cingulo-opercular network, a neural network associated with tonic alertness. PSI was also associated with reduced resting-state FC between the cingulo-opercular network and the right superior frontal gyrus, suggesting diminished executive control. Cacioppo and colleagues (2009) found that lonely individuals express weaker activation of the ventral striatum in response to pleasant pictures of people than of objects, suggesting decreased reward to social stimuli. Lonely individuals also expressed greater activation of the visual cortex in response to unpleasant depictions of people (i.e., negative facial expressions) than of objects; non-lonely individuals showed greater activation of the right and left temporoparietal junction (TPJ), a region implicated in theory of mind. The authors interpreted the findings to represent that lonely individuals pay greater attention to negative social stimuli, but non-lonely individuals, to a greater degree than lonely individuals, insert themselves into the perspective of others. Moreover, Kanai et al. (2012) reported that loneliness negatively correlated with gray matter density in the left posterior temporal sulcus, an area involved in biological motion perception, mentalizing, and social perception.

Overall, several neuroimaging studies in humans on perceived social isolation have emphasized implications of the visual cortex and right-hemispheric stress-related circuits underlying difference between lonely and non-lonely individuals. A 2020 population-genetics study marked a 50× increase in the neuroimaging research on perceived social isolation. The investigators tested for signatures of loneliness in grey matter morphology, intrinsic functional coupling, and fiber tract microstructure. The loneliness-linked neurobiological profiles converged on a collection of brain regions known as the default mode network. This higher associative network shows more consistent loneliness associations in grey matter volume than other cortical brain networks. Lonely individuals display stronger functional communication in the default network, and greater microstructural integrity of its fornix pathway. The findings fit with the possibility that the up-regulation of these neural circuits supports mentalizing, reminiscence and imagination to fill the social void.

== Social isolation in rodents ==
Experimental manipulations of social isolation in rats and mice (e.g., isolated rearing) are a common means of elucidating the effects of isolation on social animals in general. Researchers have proposed isolated rearing of rats as an etiologically valid model of human mental illness. Indeed, chronic social isolation in rats has been found to lead to depression-, anxiety-, and psychosis-like behaviors as well as signs of autonomic, neuroendocrine, and metabolic dysregulation. For example, a systematic review found that social isolation in rats is associated with increased expression of BDNF in the hippocampus, which is associated with increased anxiety-like symptoms. In another example, a study found that social isolation in rats is associated with increased brain-derived neurotrophic factor (BDNF) expression in the prefrontal cortex. This results in the dysregulation of neural activity which is associated with anxiety, depression, and social dysfunction.

The effects of experimental manipulations of isolation in nonhuman social species have been shown to resemble the effects of perceived isolation in humans, and include: increased tonic sympathetic tone and hypothalamic-pituitary-adrenal (HPA) activation and decreased inflammatory control, immunity, sleep salubrity, and expression of genes regulating glucocorticoid responses. However, the biological, neurological, and genetic mechanisms underlying these symptoms are poorly understood.

=== Neurobiology ===
Social isolation contributes to abnormal hippocampal development via specific alterations to microtubule stability and decreased MAP-2 expression. Social isolation contributes to decreased expression of the synaptic protein synaptophysin and decreased dendritic length and dendritic spine density of pyramidal cells. The underlying molecular mechanism of these structural neuronal alterations is microtubule stabilization, which impairs the remodeling and extension of axons and dendrites.

Research by Cole and colleagues showed that perceived social isolation is associated with gene expression – specifically, the under-expression of genes bearing anti-inflammatory glucocorticoid response elements and over-expression of genes bearing response elements for pro-inflammatory NF-κB/Rel transcription factors. This finding is paralleled by decreased lymphocyte sensitivity to physiological regulation by the HPA axis in lonely individuals. This, together with evidence of increased activity of the HPA axis, suggests the development of glucocorticoid resistance in chronically lonely individuals.

Social isolation can be a precipitating factor for suicidal behavior. A large body of literature suggests that individuals who experience isolation in their lives are more vulnerable to suicide than those who have strong social ties with others. A study found social isolation to be among the most common risk factors identified by Australian men who attempt suicide. Professor Ian Hickie of the University of Sydney said that social isolation was perhaps the most important factor contributing to male suicide attempts. Hickie said there was a wealth of evidence that men had more restricted social networks than women, and that these networks were heavily work-based.

A lack of social relationships negatively impacts the development of the brain's structure. In extreme cases of social isolation, studies of young mice and monkeys have shown how the brain is strongly affected by a lack of social behaviour and relationships.

Social isolation has been found to decrease oxytocin receptor levels in rodents, whereas levels of oxytocin were unchanged. The decreased oxytocin receptor levels were associated with behavioral changes including increased aggression and anxiety-like behavior, hyperactivity, and diminished social behaviors and memory. Exogenous administration of oxytocin receptor agonists like oxytocin or TGOT was able to partially reverse the behavioral changes.

=== In social animal species in general ===
In a hypothesis proposed by Cacioppo and colleagues, the isolation of a member of a social species has detrimental biological effects. In a 2009 review, Cacioppo and Hawkley noted that the health, life, and genetic legacy of members of social species are threatened when they find themselves on the social perimeter. For instance, social isolation decreases lifespan in the fruit fly; promotes obesity and type 2 diabetes in mice; exacerbates infarct size and oedema and decreases post-stroke survival rate following experimentally induced stroke in mice; promotes activation of the sympatho-adrenomedullary response to an acute immobilisation or cold stressor in rats; delays the effects of exercise on adult neurogenesis in rats; decreases open field activity, increases basal cortisol concentrations, and decreases lymphocyte proliferation to mitogens in pigs; increases the 24-hour urinary catecholamine levels and evidence of oxidative stress in the aortic arch of rabbits; and decreases the expression of genes regulating glucocorticoid response in the frontal cortex.

Social isolation in the common starling, a highly social, flocking species of bird, has also been shown to stress the isolated birds.

== Background ==
Social isolation can be both a potential cause and a symptom of emotional or psychological challenges. As a cause, the perceived inability to interact with the world and others can create an escalating pattern of these challenges. As a symptom, periods of isolation can be chronic or episodic, depending upon any cyclical changes in mood, especially in the case of clinical depression.

Everyday aspects of this type of deep-rooted social isolation can mean:

- staying home for an indefinite period of time due to lack of access to social situations rather than a desire to be alone;
- both not contacting, and not being contacted by, any acquaintances, even peripherally; for example, never being called by anybody on the telephone and never having anyone visit one's residence;
- a lack of meaningful, extended relationships, and especially close intimacy (both emotional and physical).

=== Contributing factors ===
Research suggests that the COVID pandemic increased social isolation, especially for those who lived alone and worked in jobs that could be performed remotely. Their isolation levels did not return to pre-pandemic levels.

Though the raw share of socially isolated people living alone is greater than those who live with family (see other chart), the present chart shows that the increase in pandemic-related social isolation was also experienced by those living with family.

The following risk factors contribute to why individuals distance themselves from society:

- Aging – Once a person reaches an age where problems such as cognitive impairments and disabilities arise, they are frequently unable to go out and socialize. Additionally, they may feel further feel and be ostracized due to their own age and (typical) lack of mobility.
- Health and disabilities – People may be embarrassed by their disabilities or health problems, such that they have a tendency to isolate themselves to avoid social interaction out of fear that they would be judged or stigmatized. Sometimes, rather than embarrassment, the disability itself and a person's lack of a support network can be the cause of social isolation.
- Autism – Autistic and allistic (non-autistic) people often communicate very differently, frequently leading to mutual friction when they do try interacting. As autistic people are in a steep minority, often unable to find peers who communicate the same way they do, they are often ostracised by the majority, who mistake their frequently direct, semantic communication style for them being purposefully arrogant, brash, and obtuse.
- Hearing loss – Hearing loss can cause communication impairment, which can lead to social isolation, particularly in older adults.
- Loss of a loved one – Studies have shown that widows who keep in contact with friends or relatives have better psychological health. A study conducted by Jung-Hwa Ha and Berit Ingersoll-Dayton concluded that widows who had a lot of social contact and interactions had fewer depressive symptoms. During a time of loss, social isolation is not beneficial to an individual's mental health.
- Living alone – A 2015 study by the National Center for Family & Marriage Research found 13 percent of adults in the United States were living alone, up from 12 percent in 1990. The rate of living alone for people under 45 has not changed, but the rate for Americans aged 45 – 65 has increased over the past 25 years. People over the age of 65 are living alone less often.
- Isolation may be imposed by an abusive spouse.
- Rural isolation – In rural areas, factors such as living far apart from one another, rural flight, a negligible amount of public spaces and entertainment, and lack of access to mental health-related resources all contribute to isolation. Limited access to broadband internet and cellular activity also make it harder for those experiencing isolation to connect online or reach people.
- Harassment – isolation can be an effect of someone experiencing harassment of a sexual nature.
- Unemployment – This can begin if someone is fired, dismissed, or released from a job or workplace, or leaves one of their own accords. If the person struggles or is unable to find a new job for a long period of time (i.e. months or years) the sense of isolation can become exacerbated, especially in men.
- Independent home worker – The tasks implied in this kind of job generally does not imply social interaction in the physical level, nor going outside. Interactions and payments can be made by digital media, further allowing the person to remain isolated from society.
- Retirement – being retired or having other sources of fixed income make it unnecessary for the person to go to work where they may have more social contact.
- Transportation problems – If the person does not have transportation to attend gatherings or to simply get out of the house, they often feel as though they have no choice but to stay home all day, which can lead to feelings of depression and distress.
- Societal adversity – Desire to avoid the discomfort, dangers, and responsibilities arising from being among people. This can happen if other people are sometimes, or often, rude, hostile, critical or judgmental, crude, or otherwise unpleasant. The person would just prefer to be alone to avoid the hassles and hardships of dealing with people. Being a part of an out-group and social categorization can also play a part in creating adverse circumstances that the individual may attempt to avoid depending on the policies and attitudes of the society.
- Substance abuse can be both cause and/or effect of isolation, often coinciding with mood-related disorders, especially among those living alone.
- Economic inequality – Poorer children have fewer school-class friends and are more often isolated. Adults on welfare, such as the Ontario Disability Support Program, prioritize their monthly entitlement towards rent and low-cost meals, leaving opportunities to socialize at restaurants and movie theaters out of the question.
- Cost-of-living crisis – Maintaining a social life can be expensive, with many people spending hundreds of dollars a month on activities with friends. This financial pressure, sometimes called "friendflation", can lead people to skip social events, neglect friendships, or even end a friendship to save money. It's a significant cost, but for some, the alternative is the feeling of social isolation. In fact, a survey conducted by the Korean job platform 'Alba Heaven' found that nine out of ten Gen Z respondents felt burdened by the cost of meeting up with friends.
- Self-esteem – A person with a low self-esteem or lack of self-love can contribute to that person's isolation. Having a low self-esteem can cause one to overthink and stress themselves out when being around people, and can ultimately eliminate that feeling by isolating themselves. Removing this feeling can lead to an unfortunate social life in the future and can also harm potential relationships with others. According to Northeastern University, having a low self-esteem can hold people back from reaching out to making plans with others. It can make a person feel like they are a burden, therefore once again isolating themselves. This can also lead a person into thinking that they are not worthy of making friends or deserving of love and also feeling that they do not deserve to have a happy life.
- Living in a foreign country where one may not be highly skilled in the language, or lacking social connections there.
- Lockdowns, such as those imposed in 2020 and 2021 in an attempt to prevent the spread of SARS-CoV-2.

Social isolation can begin early in life. During this time of development, a person may become more preoccupied with feelings and thoughts of their individuality that are not easy to share with other individuals. This can result from feelings of shame, guilt, or alienation during childhood experiences. Social isolation can also coincide with developmental disabilities. Individuals with learning impairments may have trouble with social interaction. The difficulties experienced academically can greatly impact the individual's esteem and sense of self-worth. An example would be the need to repeat a year of school. During the early childhood developmental years, the need to fit in and be accepted is paramount. Having a learning deficit can in turn lead to feelings of isolation, that they are somehow 'different' from others.

Whether new technologies such as the Internet and mobile phones exacerbate social isolation (of any origin) is a frequently debated topic among sociologists, with studies showing both positive correlation of social connections with use of social media as well as mood disorders coinciding with problematic use.

=== Isolation among the elderly ===
Social isolation impacts approximately 24% of older adults in the United States, approximately 9 million people. The elderly have a unique set of isolating dynamics that often perpetuate one another and can drive the individual into deeper isolation. Increasing frailty, possible declines in overall health, absent or uninvolved relatives or children, economic struggles can all add to the feeling of isolation. Among the elderly, childlessness can be a cause for social isolation. Whether their child is deceased or they did not have children at all, the loneliness that comes from not having a child can cause social isolation. Retirement, the abrupt end of daily work relationships, the death of close friends or spouses can also contribute to social isolation.

In the United States, Canada, and United Kingdom, a significant sector of the elderly who are in their 80s and 90s are brought to nursing homes if they show severe signs of social isolation. Other societies such as many in Southern Europe, Eastern Europe, East Asia, and also the Caribbean and South America, do not normally share the tendency towards admission to nursing homes, preferring instead to have children and extended-family of elderly parents take care of those elderly parents until their deaths. On the other hand, a report from Statistics Norway in 2016 stated that more than 30 percent of seniors over the age of 66 have two or fewer people to rely on should personal problems arise. Even still, nearly half of all members of senior communities are at high risk for social isolation, this is especially prevalent with seniors of a lower education and within the lower economic class and compounded with diminished availability of socializing options to these lower class individuals. There has also been an observed decrease in physical gait among members of these communities.

Social isolation among older adults has been linked to an increase in disease morbidity, a higher risk of dementia, and a decrease in physical mobility along with an increase in general health concerns. Evidence of increased cognitive decline has been link to an increase in social isolation in depressed elderly women. At the same time, increasing social connectedness has been linked to health improvements among older adults.

The use of video communication/video calls has been suggested as a potential intervention to improve social isolation in seniors. However, its effectiveness is not known.

==== Isolation and health and mortality ====
Social isolation and loneliness in older adults is associated with an increased risk for poor mental and physical health and increased mortality. There is an increased risk for early mortality in individuals experiencing social isolation compared to those who are not socially isolated. Studies have found social isolation is associated with increased risk in physical health conditions including high blood pressure, high cholesterol, elevated stress hormones, and weakened immune systems. Research also suggests that social isolation and mortality in the elderly share a common link to chronic inflammation with some differences between men and women. Social isolation has also been found to be associated with poor mental health including increased risk for depression, cognitive decline, anxiety, and substance use. Social isolation in elderly individuals is also associated with an increased risk for dementia. However, not all studies found social isolation associated with the risk of poor health outcome.

=== Isolation among children and teens ===
Middle school is a time when youth tend to be sensitive to social challenges and their self-esteem can be fragile. During this vulnerable time in development, supporting students' sense of belonging at school is of critical importance. Existing research finds that adolescents' development of a sense of belonging is an important factor in adolescence for creating social and emotional well-being and academic success. Studies have found that friendship-related loneliness is more explanatory for depressive symptoms among adolescents than parent-related loneliness. One possible explanation is that friends are the preferred source of social support during adolescence.

Scientists have long known that loneliness in adults can predispose depressive symptoms later in life. Scientists have also seen that lonely children are more susceptible to depressive symptoms in youth. In one study, researchers conclude that prevention of loneliness in childhood may be a protective factor against depression in adulthood. Socially isolated children tend to have lower subsequent educational attainment, be part of a less advantaged social class in adulthood, and are more likely to be psychologically distressed in adulthood. By receiving social assistance, studies show that children can cope more easily with high levels of stress. It is also shown that social support is strongly associated with feelings of mastery and the ability to deal with stressful situations, as well as strongly associated with increased quality of life.

=== Demographics ===
Research has shown that men and boys are more likely to experience social isolation in their lives.

== See also ==
- Asociality
- Castaway
- Clandestine abuse
- Emotional isolation
- Existential isolation
- Existential crisis
- Hikikomori
- Hedgehog's dilemma
- Loner
- Pit of despair
- Solitary confinement
- Solitude
- Stigma management
- Social alienation
- Social anxiety
- Social connection
- Social exclusion
- Social invisibility
- Social network
- Social rejection
- Social relation
- Social stigma
- Touch starvation
