= Oxytocin receptor agonist =

Chemical compound

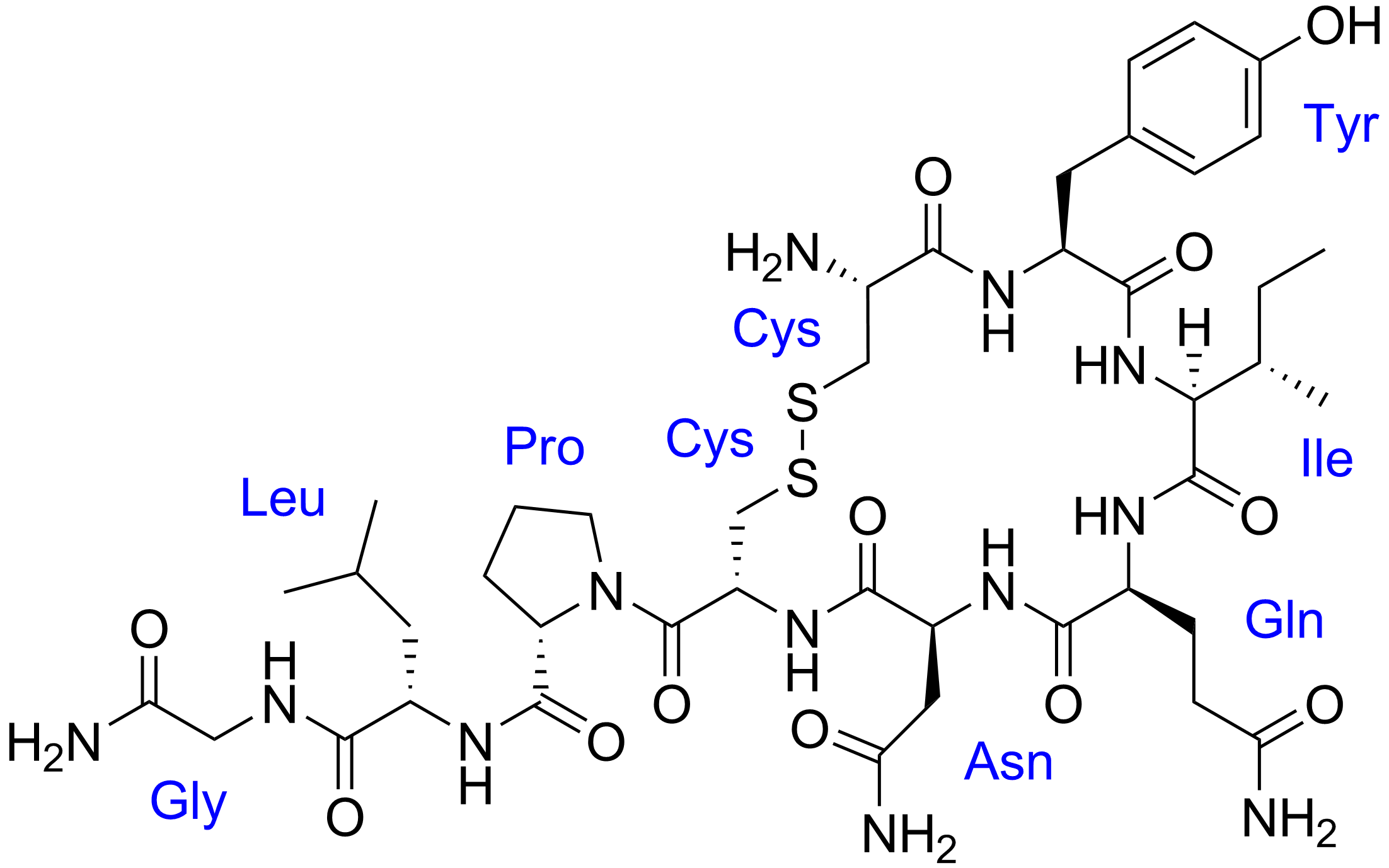
Oxytocin, an example of a peptide oxytocin receptor agonist.

LIT-001, an example of a small-molecule oxytocin receptor agonist.

An oxytocin receptor agonist is a compound that acts as an agonist of the oxytocin receptor. They include peptides like oxytocin and carbetocin and small-molecules like LIT-001 and LIT-002. Peptide oxytocin receptor agonists are used medically to induce labor, promote lactation, and for certain other uses.

Oxytocin receptor agonists are of theoretical interest for the potential treatment of neuropsychiatric disorders with social symptoms, such as autism, social anxiety, and psychopathy. Small-molecule oxytocin receptor agonists are considered to be more promising for such uses due to better potential pharmacokinetic profiles, such as blood–brain barrier permeability, elimination half-lives, and oral bioavailability.

The entactogen MDMA robustly increases oxytocin levels, by 4- to 8-fold, and this is thought to be involved in its entactogenic effects, including its euphoric, anxiolytic, and prosocial effects. In people with arginine vasopressin deficiency (central diabetes insipidus), who also have oxytocin deficiency, MDMA fails to elevate oxytocin levels and shows greatly blunted entactogenic effects. Accordingly, carbetocin partially substitutes for MDMA in drug discrimination tests in rodents, whereas the peptide oxytocin receptor antagonist atosiban interfered with MDMA discrimination. In addition, oxytocin receptor antagonists have been found to block the prosocial effects of MDMA in rodents.

Social isolation has been found to decrease oxytocin receptor levels in rodents, whereas levels of oxytocin were unchanged. The decreased oxytocin receptor levels were associated with behavioral changes including increased aggression and anxiety-like behavior, hyperactivity, and diminished social behaviors and memory. Exogenous administration of oxytocin receptor agonists like oxytocin or TGOT was able to partially reverse the behavioral changes.

== List of oxytocin receptor agonists ==
=== Peptides ===
- Carbetocin
- Demoxytocin
- Lipo-oxytocin-1 (LOT-1)
- Merotocin (FE-202767)
- Oxytocin
- PF-06655075 (PF1; ASK1476)
- TGOT
- Vasotocin

=== Non-peptides ===
- CA7 – among smallest-known oxytocin receptor agonists; considerable selectivity over the vasopressin V_{1A} receptor
- KNX-200 (KNX200) – series; chemical structure(s) not yet disclosed
- LIT-001 — improved social deficits in mice; non-selective over vasopressin receptors
- LIT-002 – highly potent, under formal development
- TC OT 39 – non-selective over vasopressin receptors
- WAY-267,464 – anxiolytic in mice; possibly non-selective over vasopressin receptors
- WJ0679 – among smallest-known oxytocin receptor agonists; produces prosocial effects in rodents

In April 2025, a series of novel and highly potent small-molecule oxytocin receptor agonists with high selectivity over the vasopressin V_{1A} receptor (up to >5,000-fold) were patented and described.

=== Unknown ===
- NP-1031

=== Indirect ===
- KNX-100 (SOC-1) – pro-social and anti-addictive effects

== See also ==
- Oxytocin receptor antagonist
- Oxytocin deficiency
