= C20H22N2O3 =

The molecular formula C_{20}H_{22}N_{2}O_{3} (molar mass: 338.400 g/mol, exact mass: 338.1630 u) may refer to:

- Picrinine
- URB597 (KDS-4103)
- Nolasiban
