= Tocinoic acid =

Oxytocin receptor antagonist

Clinical data
- Other names: TOC; 7-de-Pro-3-de-Leu-3-de-GlyNH_{2}-deoxytocin
- Drug class: Oxytocin receptor antagonist

Identifiers
- IUPAC name: (4R,7S,10S,16S,19R)-19-amino-7-(2-amino-2-oxoethyl)-10-(3-amino-3-oxopropyl)-13-[(2S)-butan-2-yl]-16-[(4-hydroxyphenyl)methyl]-6,9,12,15,18-pentaoxo-1,2-dithia-5,8,11,14,17-pentazacycloicosane-4-carboxylic acid
- CAS Number: 34330-23-9
- PubChem CID: 3082393
- ChemSpider: 2339833

Chemical and physical data
- Formula: C_{30}H_{44}N_{8}O_{10}S_{2}
- Molar mass: 740.85 g·mol^{−1}
- 3D model (JSmol): Interactive image
- SMILES: CC[C@H](C)C1C(=O)N[C@H](C(=O)N[C@H](C(=O)N[C@@H](CSSC[C@@H](C(=O)N[C@H](C(=O)N1)CC2=CC=C(C=C2)O)N)C(=O)O)CC(=O)N)CCC(=O)N
- InChI: InChI=1S/C30H44N8O10S2/c1-3-14(2)24-29(46)34-18(8-9-22(32)40)26(43)36-20(11-23(33)41)27(44)37-21(30(47)48)13-50-49-12-17(31)25(42)35-19(28(45)38-24)10-15-4-6-16(39)7-5-15/h4-7,14,17-21,24,39H,3,8-13,31H2,1-2H3,(H2,32,40)(H2,33,41)(H,34,46)(H,35,42)(H,36,43)(H,37,44)(H,38,45)(H,47,48)/t14-,17-,18-,19-,20-,21-,24?/m0/s1; Key:ITRWUGOBSKHPTA-LYZHYIKWSA-N

Tocinoic acid is a peptide oxytocin receptor antagonist which is used in scientific research. Intracerebroventricular injection of the drug has been found to block the prosocial behavior induced by the serotonin releasing agent MDMA without affecting baseline social behavior in animals. Similar findings have been made for the non-peptide selective oxytocin receptor antagonist L-368899. However, in other studies, other oxytocin receptor antagonists have been ineffective in blocking MDMA-induced prosocial behavior. The reasons for these discrepancies are unclear.

== See also ==
- Atosiban
- Entactogen § Mechanism of action
