= WJ0679 =

Clinical data
- Other names: Example 15
- Drug class: Oxytocin receptor agonist; Vasopressin receptor antagonist; Vasopressin V_{1A} receptor antagonist
- ATC code: None

Identifiers
- IUPAC name: (3-fluorophenyl)-(1-methyl-4,10-dihydropyrazolo[4,5-c][1,5]benzodiazepin-5-yl)methanone
- PubChem CID: 142372974

Chemical and physical data
- Formula: C_{18}H_{15}FN_{4}O
- Molar mass: 322.343 g·mol^{−1}
- 3D model (JSmol): Interactive image
- SMILES: CN1C2=C(CN(C3=CC=CC=C3N2)C(=O)C4=CC(=CC=C4)F)C=N1
- InChI: InChI=1S/C18H15FN4O/c1-22-17-13(10-20-22)11-23(16-8-3-2-7-15(16)21-17)18(24)12-5-4-6-14(19)9-12/h2-10,21H,11H2,1H3; Key:KGAWZUYTLYAFPY-UHFFFAOYSA-N

WJ0679 is a small-molecule oxytocin receptor agonist and vasopressin receptor antagonist. It acts specifically as a very weak partial agonist of the oxytocin receptor (K_{i} = 422 nM; EC_{50} = 406 nM; E_{max} = 13%) and as an antagonist of the vasopressin V_{1A} receptor (K_{i} = 105 nM; IC_{50} = 2,203 nM), whereas no data were reported for the vasopressin V_{2} receptor. Despite its low activational efficacy at the oxytocin receptor, WJ0679 induces prosocial effects, including increased time spent in close physical contact and increased active social investigation, in rodents.

The chemical synthesis of WJ0679 has been described. Along with its close analogue CA7, WJ0679 has the smallest chemical structure known for an oxytocin receptor agonist, with WJ0679 having about 60% of the molecular weight of LIT-001 and both WJ0679 and CA7 lacking LIT-001's tail component. Many analogues of WJ0679 and CA7 have been described.

WJ0679 was first described in the scientific literature by a group including Michael Kassiou, Michael Bowen, Iain McGregor, and others at the University of Sydney in 2018. This group has founded a startup pharmaceutical company called Kinoxis Therapeutics and is developing small-molecule oxytocin-related drugs like KNX-100 and the KNX-200 series for potential medical use as of the 2020s.

== See also ==
- Oxytocin receptor agonist
- CA7 and KNX-100
