= List of investigational Prader–Willi syndrome drugs =

Investigational substance-related disorder drugs

This is a list of investigational Prader–Willi syndrome drugs, or drugs that are currently under development for clinical use for the treatment of Prader–Willi syndrome (PWS) but are not yet approved.

Chemical/generic names are listed first, with developmental code names, synonyms, and brand names in parentheses. The format of list items is "Name (Synonyms) – Mechanism of Action [Reference]".

This list was last comprehensively updated in July 2026. It is likely to become outdated with time.

== Under development ==
=== Phase 3 ===
- Denatonium acetate (ARD-101) – taste receptor 2 (TAS2R; bitter taste receptor) agonist
- Pitolisant (BF-2.649; BF-2649; HBS-201; HBS-301; Ozawade; tiprolisant; Wakix) – histamine H_{3} receptor antagonist

=== Phase 2/3 ===
- Cannabidiol synthetic (CBD; pharmaceutical cannabidiol; RAD-011) – non-psychoactive cannabinoid and various actions

=== Phase 2 ===
- BMB-101 – serotonin 5-HT_{2C} receptor agonist
- Cannabidivarin (CBDV; GWP-42006) – non-psychoactive cannabinoid and various actions
- CSTI-500 (AMR-001181) – serotonin–norepinephrine–dopamine reuptake inhibitor (SNDRI)
- Ercanetide (NNZ-2591; ACP-2591; cyclo-L-glycyl-L-2-allylproline; PMS-001) – synthetic analogue of cyclic glycine-proline (cGP; traneurocin) and various actions
- GDD-3898 – stearoyl-CoA desaturase (SCD) inhibitor
- RGH-706 – melanin-concentrating hormone receptor 1 (MCHR1) antagonist
- Sepranolone (isoallopregnanolone; epiallopregnanolone; UC-1010) – GABA_{A} receptor negative allosteric modulator and neurosteroid
- Setmelanotide (BIM-22493; CAM-4072; Imcivree; RM-493) – melanocortin MC_{4} receptor agonist
- Tesofensine/metoprolol (metoprolol/tesofensine; Tesomet) – combination of tesofensine (serotonin–norepinephrine–dopamine reuptake inhibitor (SNDRI)) and metoprolol (beta blocker)

=== Phase 1/2 ===
- RM-718 – melanocortin MC_{4} receptor agonist

=== Phase 1 ===
- BMB-105 – serotonin 5-HT_{2C} receptor agonist
- Oxytocin (intranasal potentiated oxytocin; oxytocin intranasal; TI-001; TI-114; TNX-1900; TNX-2900) – oxytocin receptor agonist

=== Preclinical ===
- HBS-102 (CSTI-100) – melanin-concentrating hormone receptor 1 (MCHR1) antagonist

=== Research ===
- NP-1031 – oxytocin receptor modulator

=== Phase unknown ===
- BSN-272 – undefined mechanism of action

== Not under development ==
=== No development reported ===
- GLWL-01 - ghrelin O-acyltransferase (GOAT) inhibitor
- HM-04 – ghrelin receptor antagonist
- RM-853 (T-3525770) – ghrelin O-acyltransferase (GOAT) inhibitor

=== Discontinued ===
- Beloranib (6-O-(4-dimethylaminoethoxy) cinnamoyl fumagillol hemioxalate; beloranib hemioxalate; CKD-732; TNP-470 analogue; ZGN-433; ZGN-440) – methionine aminopeptidase 2 (METAP2) inhibitor
- Carbetocin intranasal (ACP-101; FE-992097; LV-101) – oxytocin receptor agonist
- Livoletide (AZP-531; UAG-analogue-Alize; unacylated-analogue-Alize) – unacylated ghrelin (UAG) analogue and acylated ghrelin antagonist
- NM-136 (LOB-0136) – monoclonal antibody against gastric inhibitory polypeptide (GIP)
- Zevaquenabant (INV-101) – cannabinoid CB_{1} receptor antagonist

== Clinically used drugs ==
=== Approved drugs ===
- Diazoxide choline controlled release (C601; C602; DCCR; Vykat XR) – K_{ATP} potassium channel opener
- Somatropin (Genotonorm; Genotropin; PN-180,307) – human growth hormone (hGH) replacement
- Somatropin (Humatrope; Hutrope; LY-137998; Umatrope) – human growth hormone (hGH) replacement
- Somatropin biosimilar (Omnitrope; PrOmnitrope) – human growth hormone (hGH) replacement

== See also ==
- Lists of investigational drugs
