= Merotocin =

Chemical compound

Clinical data
- Other names: FE-202767; FE202767; Carba-1-(4-FBzlGly^{7})dOT; N-(4-Sulfanylbutanoyl)-L-tyrosyl-L-isoleucyl-L-glutaminyl-L-asparaginyl-L-cysteinyl-N-[(4-fluorophenyl)methyl]glycyl-L-leucylglycinamide cyclic (1-5)-thioether
- Routes of administration: Intranasal
- Drug class: Oxytocin receptor agonist
- ATC code: None

Pharmacokinetic data
- Elimination half-life: ~30 minutes (IN)

Identifiers
- IUPAC name: (3R,6S,9S,12S,15S)-6-(2-Amino-2-oxoethyl)-N-[2-[[(2S)-1-[(2-amino-2-oxoethyl)amino]-4-methyl-1-oxopentan-2-yl]amino]-2-oxoethyl]-9-(3-amino-3-oxopropyl)-12-[(2S)-butan-2-yl]-N-[(4-fluorophenyl)methyl]-15-[(4-hydroxyphenyl)methyl]-5,8,11,14,17-pentaoxo-1-thia-4,7,10,13,16-pentazacycloicosane-3-carboxamide
- CAS Number: 1190083-57-8
- PubChem CID: 76073634
- ChemSpider: 34994563
- UNII: UW3ON116CO

Chemical and physical data
- Formula: C_{48}H_{68}FN_{11}O_{12}S
- Molar mass: 1042.20 g·mol^{−1}
- 3D model (JSmol): Interactive image
- SMILES: CC[C@H](C)[C@H]1C(=O)N[C@H](C(=O)N[C@H](C(=O)N[C@@H](CSCCCC(=O)N[C@H](C(=O)N1)Cc2ccc(cc2)O)C(=O)N(Cc3ccc(cc3)F)CC(=O)N[C@@H](CC(C)C)C(=O)NCC(=O)N)CC(=O)N)CCC(=O)N
- InChI: InChI=1S/C48H68FN11O12S/c1-5-27(4)42-47(71)56-32(16-17-37(50)62)44(68)57-35(21-38(51)63)45(69)58-36(25-73-18-6-7-40(65)54-34(46(70)59-42)20-28-10-14-31(61)15-11-28)48(72)60(23-29-8-12-30(49)13-9-29)24-41(66)55-33(19-26(2)3)43(67)53-22-39(52)64/h8-15,26-27,32-36,42,61H,5-7,16-25H2,1-4H3,(H2,50,62)(H2,51,63)(H2,52,64)(H,53,67)(H,54,65)(H,55,66)(H,56,71)(H,57,68)(H,58,69)(H,59,70)/t27-,32-,33-,34-,35-,36-,42-/m0/s1; Key:PVVHQWISMVJHFK-NIFJBHDKSA-N

Merotocin (INN; developmental code FE-202767; also known as carba-1-(4-FBzlGly^{7})dOT) is a peptidic agonist of the oxytocin receptor that was derived from oxytocin. It is under development by Ferring Pharmaceuticals for the treatment of preterm mothers with lactation failure requiring lactation support, and is in phase II clinical trials for this indication. Merotocin is potent (EC_{50} < 0.1 nM) and highly selective (>1000-fold over the related vasopressin receptors). Its elimination half-life is approximately 30 minutes via intranasal administration.

== See also ==
- Oxytocin receptor agonist
- Carbetocin
- Demoxytocin
- TC OT 39
- WAY-267,464
