= KNX-100 =

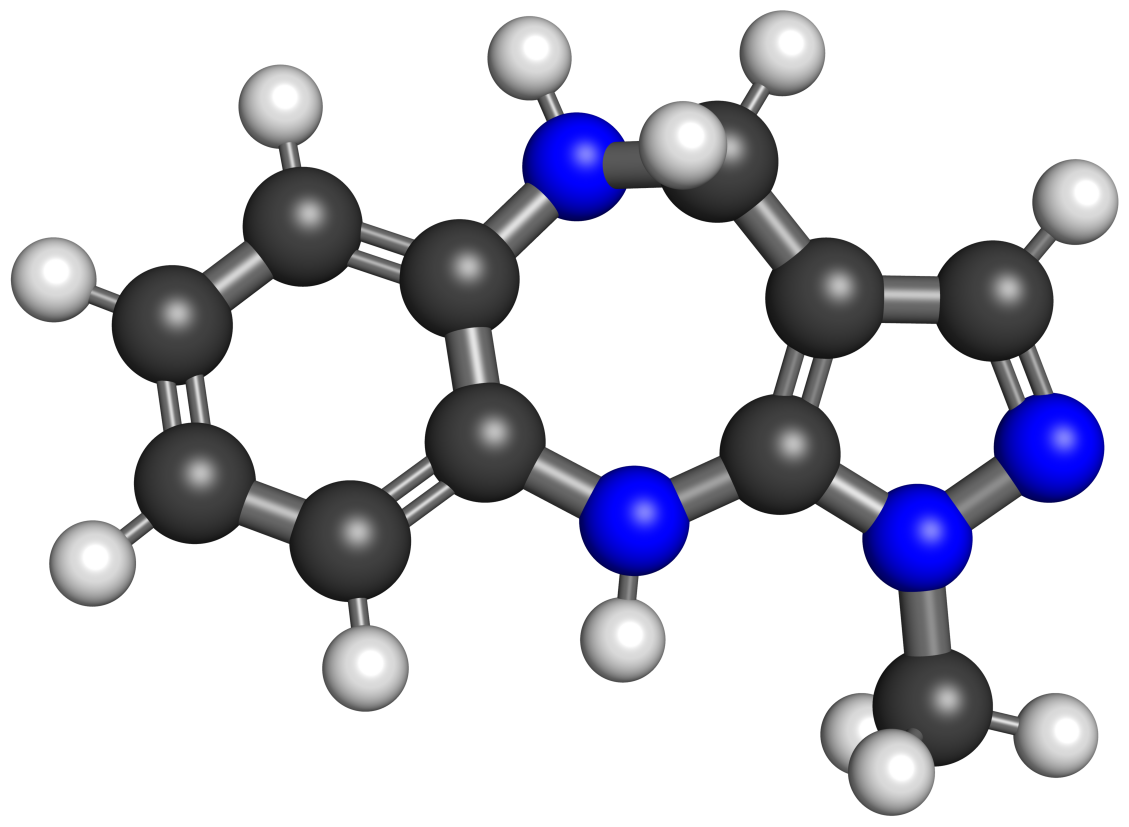

Clinical data
- Other names: KNX100; Synthetic oxytocin-like compound 1; SOC-1; SOC1
- Routes of administration: Oral
- Drug class: Oxytocin-like drug; Indirect oxytocin receptor modulator; Arachidonate 15-lipoxygenase (ALOX15) inhibitor
- ATC code: None

Identifiers
- IUPAC name: 1-methyl-1,4,5,10-tetrahydrobenzo[b]pyrazolo[3,4-e][1,4]diazepine
- CAS Number: 479234-83-8
- PubChem CID: 135741977
- ChemSpider: 16096687
- UNII: Y6CLK4BRD4

Chemical and physical data
- Formula: C_{11}H_{12}N_{4}
- Molar mass: 200.245 g·mol^{−1}
- 3D model (JSmol): Interactive image
- SMILES: CN1C2=C(CNC3=CC=CC=C3N2)C=N1
- InChI: InChI=1S/C11H12N4/c1-15-11-8(7-13-15)6-12-9-4-2-3-5-10(9)14-11/h2-5,7,12,14H,6H2,1H3; Key:YAHHFPJGDOWLGU-UHFFFAOYSA-N

KNX-100, also known as synthetic oxytocin-like compound 1 (SOC-1), is a small-molecule oxytocin-like drug or indirect oxytocin receptor modulator acting as an arachidonate 15-lipoxygenase (ALOX15) inhibitor which is under development for the treatment of aggression and agitation in dementia, opioid-related disorders, other substance-related disorders, and behavioral disorders. It is taken orally.

== Pharmacology ==
The pharmacodynamics, pharmacokinetics, and toxicity of KNX-100 have been studied.

=== Pharmacokinetics ===
KNX-100 has improved pharmacokinetics relative to oxytocin, such as enhanced oral bioavailability, blood–brain barrier permeability, and metabolic stability, and may overcome the pharmacokinetic and efficacy limitations of oxytocin.

=== Pharmacodynamics ===
KNX-100 produces oxytocin-like effects, such as pro-social, anti-aggressive, and anti-addictive effects among others, in rodents and monkeys. The drug reduced self-administration of methamphetamine in rats by 85%, of cocaine in rhesus monkeys by 90%, and of alcohol in baboons by more than 50%. It is thought that KNX-100 may produce its antiaddictive effects by discounting drug reward in favor of social reward. In addition to its antiaddictive effects, KNX-100 reduces opioid withdrawal and nicotine withdrawal symptoms in animals. It appears to act to reduce opioid withdrawal symptoms by suppressing increased dynorphin/κ-opioid receptor signaling in the nucleus accumbens shell.

Unexpectedly, KNX-100 did not show affinity for the oxytocin receptor nor act as an agonist, antagonist, or positive allosteric modulator of the receptor, but nonetheless robustly activates oxytocinergic signaling. In fact, KNX-100 can activate oxytocinergic signaling and cause associated effects to a greater extent than oxytocin itself. Screening at more than 100 different receptors and transporters was initially unable to identify the drug's biological target. It was suggested that KNX-100 may be acting at an upstream target to indirectly modulate the oxytocin system and increase oxytocin production. Subsequently, KNX-100 was said by its developers to have a novel undisclosed mechanism of action. In January 2026, it was disclosed that KNX-100 acts as an inhibitor of arachidonate 15-lipoxygenase (ALOX15), a lipoxygenase enzyme involved in the metabolism of polyunsaturated fatty acids (PUFAs).

== Chemistry ==
KNX-100 is a synthetic small molecule and peptide fragment of the oxytocin system. Its chemical structure has been disclosed by its developers in a patent. The chemical synthesis of KNX-100 has been described. The small-molecule oxytocin receptor agonists LIT-001 and LIT-002 are derivatives of KNX-100. The more-compact small-molecule oxytocin receptor agonists WJ0679 and CA7 are also analogues of KNX-100.

== History ==
KNX-100 was first described in the scientific literature by 2012. It was originated at the University of Sydney by Iain McGregor and Michael Bowen and colleagues and is under development by Kinoxis Therapeutics in partnership with Boehringer Ingelheim. In 2018, it was reported that KNX-100 had been under development for more than a decade. The drug was identified via a phenotypic screen of compounds derived from a fragment-based drug discovery system targeting the oxytocin system. In January 2026, it was disclosed that KNX-100's mechanism of action is inhibition of the enzyme arachidonate 15-lipoxygenase (ALOX15).

== Research ==
As of August 2025, KNX-100 is in phase 2 clinical trials for treatment of agitation and aggression in dementia, phase 1 trials for opioid-related disorders and substance-related disorders, and the preclinical research stage of development for behavioral disorders. Phase 1 trials were first planned for 2019. Several clinical trials of KNX-100 have been registered with details provided. In addition to the preceding indications, there is also interest in KNX-100 for other potential applications like treatment of social anxiety, other types of addiction besides substance addiction like gambling, and pain, among others. Besides KNX-100, Kinoxis Therapeutics also has selective oxytocin receptor partial agonists like its KNX-200 series and oxytocin receptor positive allosteric modulators like its KNX-300/400 series in its developmental pipeline.

== See also ==
- Oxytocin receptor agonist
- List of investigational aggression drugs
- List of investigational agitation drugs
- List of investigational substance-related disorder drugs
- List of investigational other psychiatric disorder drugs
- List of investigational autism and pervasive developmental disorder drugs
- KNX-101
- LIT-001 and LIT-002
