= Demoxytocin =

Chemical compound

Clinical data
- Other names: ODA-914; 1-mercaptopropionate- oxytoxin
- Routes of administration: Buccal
- Drug class: Oxytocin receptor agonist
- ATC code: H01BB01 (WHO)

Legal status
- Legal status: In general: ℞ (Prescription only)

Identifiers
- IUPAC name: 2-[(1-{[13-(butan-2-yl)-10-(2-carbamoylethyl)-7-(carbamoylmethyl)-16-[(4-hydroxyphenyl)methyl]-6,9,12,15,18-pentaoxo-1,2-dithia-5,8,11,14,17-pentaazacycloicosan-4-yl]carbonyl}pyrrolidin-2-yl)formamido]-N-(carbamoylmethyl)-4-methylpentanamide
- CAS Number: 113-78-0
- PubChem CID: 449224
- ChemSpider: 395815
- UNII: 2N9HM3X95F
- ChEBI: CHEBI:135900
- CompTox Dashboard (EPA): DTXSID701016964
- ECHA InfoCard: 100.003.668

Chemical and physical data
- Formula: C_{43}H_{65}N_{11}O_{12}S_{2}
- Molar mass: 992.18 g·mol^{−1}
- 3D model (JSmol): Interactive image
- SMILES: CC[C@H](C)[C@H]1C(=O)N[C@H](C(=O)N[C@H](C(=O)N[C@@H](CSSCCC(=O)N[C@H](C(=O)N1)Cc2ccc(cc2)O)C(=O)N3CCC[C@H]3C(=O)N[C@@H](CC(C)C)C(=O)NCC(=O)N)CC(=O)N)CCC(=O)N
- InChI: InChI=1S/C43H65N11O12S2/c1-5-23(4)36-42(65)49-26(12-13-32(44)56)38(61)50-29(19-33(45)57)39(62)52-30(21-68-67-16-14-35(59)48-28(40(63)53-36)18-24-8-10-25(55)11-9-24)43(66)54-15-6-7-31(54)41(64)51-27(17-22(2)3)37(60)47-20-34(46)58/h8-11,22-23,26-31,36,55H,5-7,12-21H2,1-4H3,(H2,44,56)(H2,45,57)(H2,46,58)(H,47,60)(H,48,59)(H,49,65)(H,50,61)(H,51,64)(H,52,62)(H,53,63)/t23-,26-,27-,28-,29-,30-,31-,36-/m0/s1; Key:GTYWGUNQAMYZPF-QPLNMOKZSA-N

Demoxytocin (INN; brand names Sandopart, Odeax, Sandopral; also known as desaminooxytocin, deaminooxytocin, 1-(3-mercaptopropanoic acid)oxytocin, and [Mpa^{1}]OT) is an oxytocic peptide drug that is used to induce labor, promote lactation, and to prevent and treat puerperal (postpartum) mastitis (breast inflammation). Demoxytocin is a synthetic analogue of oxytocin and has similar activities, but is more potent and has a longer half-life in comparison. Unlike oxytocin, which is given via intravenous injection, demoxytocin is administered as a buccal tablet formulation.

The drug was first synthesized in 1960 and was introduced into clinical practice in 1971 by Sandoz. It is marketed in several European countries, including Italy, Czech Republic, and Poland. It has the amino acid sequence Mpa-Tyr-Ile-Gln-Asn-Cys-Pro-Leu-Gly-NH_{2} (Mpa = β-mercaptopropionic acid), and is an analogue of oxytocin wherein the leading cysteine is replaced with β-mercaptopropionic acid.

== Uses and Impact ==
Labour was induced or stimulated after random allocation of the mothers to one of three oxytocics (prostaglandin E2 orally, oxytocin intravenously, or demoxytocin buccally).Using as models, the neurohypophyseal nonapeptide hormone oxytocin and its analogue deaminooxytocin, several directed routes to formation of sulfur-sulfur bridges have been developed and evaluated. PGE2 tablets (Prostin) were given to 109 parturients and demoxytocin resoriblets (Sandopart) to 84. Use of oral oxytocics for stimulation of labor in cases of premature rupture of the membranes at term. A randomized comparative study of prostaglandin E2 tablets and demoxytocin resoriblets. The efficacy of oral PGE2 tablets and buccal demoxytocin (resoriblets) for the induction of labor in cases of premature rupture of the membranes (PROM) after the 37th week of gestation has been evaluated in a prospective, randomized investigation of 193 women.

== Pharmacology ==
=== Pharmacodynamics ===
Demoxytocin is a peptide analogue of oxytocin and acts as an oxytocin receptor agonist.

== See also ==
- Oxytocin receptor agonist
- Carbetocin
- Merotocin
- TC OT 39
- WAY-267,464
