= TGOT =

Clinical data
- Other names: TG-OT; TgOT; [Thr^{4},Gly^{7}]-oxytocin; [Thr^{4},Gly^{7}]-OT
- Drug class: Oxytocin receptor agonist
- ATC code: None

Identifiers
- IUPAC name: (2S)-N-[(2R)-1-[[2-[[(2S)-1-[(2-amino-2-oxoethyl)amino]-4-methyl-1-oxopentan-2-yl]amino]-2-oxoethyl]amino]-1-oxo-3-sulfanylpropan-2-yl]-2-[[(2S,3R)-2-[[(2S,3S)-2-[[(2S)-2-[[(2R)-2-amino-3-sulfanylidenepropanoyl]amino]-3-(4-hydroxyphenyl)propanoyl]amino]-3-methylpentanoyl]amino]-3-hydroxybutanoyl]amino]butanediamide
- CAS Number: 60786-59-6
- PubChem CID: 3080871
- IUPHAR/BPS: 2179
- ChemSpider: 2338591

Chemical and physical data
- Formula: C_{39}H_{61}N_{11}O_{12}S_{2}
- Molar mass: 940.10 g·mol^{−1}
- 3D model (JSmol): Interactive image
- SMILES: CC[C@H](C)[C@@H](C(=O)N[C@@H]([C@@H](C)O)C(=O)N[C@@H](CC(=O)N)C(=O)N[C@@H](CS)C(=O)NCC(=O)N[C@@H](CC(C)C)C(=O)NCC(=O)N)NC(=O)[C@H](CC1=CC=C(C=C1)O)NC(=O)[C@H](C=S)N
- InChI: InChI=1S/C39H61N11O12S2/c1-6-19(4)31(49-37(60)25(46-33(56)23(40)16-63)12-21-7-9-22(52)10-8-21)38(61)50-32(20(5)51)39(62)47-26(13-28(41)53)36(59)48-27(17-64)35(58)44-15-30(55)45-24(11-18(2)3)34(57)43-14-29(42)54/h7-10,16,18-20,23-27,31-32,51-52,64H,6,11-15,17,40H2,1-5H3,(H2,41,53)(H2,42,54)(H,43,57)(H,44,58)(H,45,55)(H,46,56)(H,47,62)(H,48,59)(H,49,60)(H,50,61)/t19-,20+,23-,24-,25-,26-,27-,31-,32-/m0/s1; Key:SJRRTEZQOSELMP-IKNHWLCZSA-N

TGOT, also known as [Thr^{4},Gly^{7}]-oxytocin, is a synthetic peptide oxytocin receptor agonist which is widely used in scientific research. It is a potent and selective agonist of the oxytocin receptor. The drug has very high affinity and selectivity for the oxytocin receptor in rodents but the same is not true in humans, and hence it shows no advantage over oxytocin in humans.

TGOT has been found to partially reverse the adverse behavioral changes caused by social isolation in rodents, for instance social avoidance and aggression. It shows partially dissociable effects from those of oxytocin in rodents, which may be related to comparative selectivity against vasopressin receptors.

TGOT was first described in the scientific literature by 1977. TGOT, or [Thr^{4},Gly^{7}]-oxytocin, should not be confused with triglycyl-oxytocin, which is also known by the acronym TGOT but is a different peptide oxytocin analogue that is far less-known in comparison.

== See also ==
- Oxytocin receptor agonist
