= Denatonium acetate =

Chemical compound

Denatonium acetate (ARD-101) is an experimental anti-obesity drug that is a prodrug of the bitter compound denatonium, which is thought to be an agonist of the bitter-sensing type 2 taste receptors (TAS2R). It is hoped to activate the TAS2R receptors in the gut. It is tested in healthy adults and people with Prader-Willi syndrome.

== See also ==
- List of investigational Prader–Willi syndrome drugs
