= CA7 (drug) =

Clinical data
- Other names: Example 52
- Drug class: Oxytocin receptor agonist
- ATC code: None

Identifiers
- IUPAC name: cycloheptyl(4,10-dihydro-1H-pyrrolo[3,2-c][1,5]benzodiazepin-5-yl)methanone
- PubChem CID: 135131730

Chemical and physical data
- Formula: C_{19}H_{23}N_{3}O
- Molar mass: 309.413 g·mol^{−1}
- 3D model (JSmol): Interactive image
- SMILES: C1CCCC(CC1)C(=O)N2CC3=C(NC=C3)NC4=CC=CC=C42
- InChI: InChI=1S/C19H23N3O/c23-19(14-7-3-1-2-4-8-14)22-13-15-11-12-20-18(15)21-16-9-5-6-10-17(16)22/h5-6,9-12,14,20-21H,1-4,7-8,13H2; Key:LTLODARRUYXQKQ-UHFFFAOYSA-N

CA7 is a small-molecule oxytocin receptor agonist. It is said to be potent as an agonist of the oxytocin receptor and to show considerable selectivity over the vasopressin V_{1A} receptor, where it displayed no functional activity. However, the exact affinity and activity values at these receptors do not appear to have been disclosed.

The chemical synthesis of CA7 has been described. Along with its close analogue WJ0679, CA7 has the smallest chemical structure known for an oxytocin receptor agonist, with WJ0679 having about 60% of the molecular weight of LIT-001 and both WJ0679 and CA7 lacking LIT-001's tail component. Many analogues of WJ0679 and CA7 have been described.

CA7 was first described in the scientific literature by a group including Michael Kassiou, Michael Bowen, Iain McGregor, and others at the University of Sydney in 2018. This group has founded a startup pharmaceutical company called Kinoxis Therapeutics and is developing small-molecule oxytocin-related drugs like KNX-100 and the KNX-200 series for potential medical use as of the 2020s.

== See also ==
- Oxytocin receptor agonist
- KNX-100
