= Nolasiban =

Clinical data
- Other names: Erlosiban; OBE-001; OBE001; RPN-002; RPN002
- Drug class: Oxytocin receptor antagonist

Pharmacokinetic data
- Elimination half-life: 12 hours

Identifiers
- IUPAC name: [(2S,4Z)-2-(hydroxymethyl)-4-methoxyiminopyrrolidin-1-yl]-[4-(2-methylphenyl)phenyl]methanone
- CAS Number: 1477482-19-1
- PubChem CID: 52947354
- DrugBank: DB16259
- ChemSpider: 26350515
- UNII: 3765U8A1EC
- ChEMBL: ChEMBL1254025

Chemical and physical data
- Formula: C_{20}H_{22}N_{2}O_{3}
- Molar mass: 338.407 g·mol^{−1}
- 3D model (JSmol): Interactive image
- SMILES: CC1=CC=CC=C1C2=CC=C(C=C2)C(=O)N3C/C(=N\OC)/C[C@H]3CO
- InChI: InChI=1S/C20H22N2O3/c1-14-5-3-4-6-19(14)15-7-9-16(10-8-15)20(24)22-12-17(21-25-2)11-18(22)13-23/h3-10,18,23H,11-13H2,1-2H3/b21-17-/t18-/m0/s1; Key:OLUJSZLBWZWGJT-HGBKYHTQSA-N

Nolasiban (INN; developmental code names OBE001 and RPN-002), also known previously as erlosiban, is an oxytocin receptor antagonist which is under development for the treatment of female infertility and adenomyosis. It was also under development for the treatment of preterm labor, but development for this indication was discontinued. The drug is a small molecule or non-peptide and is taken orally.

The drug interacts with both the oxytocin receptor (K_{i} = 52 nM; IC_{50} = 81 nM) and the vasopressin V_{1A} receptor (K_{i} = 120 nM), whereas findings for the vasopressin V_{2} receptor were not reported. It is of relatively low potency, being used and studied clinically at doses of 900 to 2,400 mg orally.

Nolasiban was first described in the scientific literature by 2015. It was originated by Merck Serono and is under development by ObsEva and ReproNovo. As of July 2026, the drug is in phase 2 clinical trials for female infertility and phase 1 trials for adenomyosis. It was also previously in phase 3 trials in the late 2010s.

== See also ==
- Oxytocin receptor antagonist
- Epelsiban
