= Social dysfunction =

Psychiatric condition

Social dysfunction characterises a number of socially deficit mental disorders that affects social functioning. Social dysfunction is a core symptom of social anxiety disorder (social phobia), autism, dementia, PTSD, schizophrenia and some personality disorders.

Oxytocin receptor agonists, like oxytocin and LIT-001, and CA7 are of theoretical interest in the potential medical treatment of social dysfunction.
