= LIT-002 =

Clinical data
- Other names: LIT002
- Drug class: Oxytocin receptor agonist; Vasopressin V_{2} receptor agonist

Identifiers
- IUPAC name: (2S,4R)-2-(dimethylcarbamothioyl)-4-[4-(hydroxymethyl)triazol-1-yl]-N-[[2-methyl-4-(1-methyl-4,10-dihydropyrazolo[4,5-c][1,5]benzodiazepine-5-carbonyl)phenyl]methyl]pyrrolidine-1-carboxamide
- PubChem CID: 178316487
- ChEMBL: ChEMBL6199678

Chemical and physical data
- Formula: C_{31}H_{36}N_{10}O_{3}S
- Molar mass: 628.76 g·mol^{−1}
- 3D model (JSmol): Interactive image
- SMILES: CC1=C(C=CC(=C1)C(=O)N2CC3=C(NC4=CC=CC=C42)N(N=C3)C)CNC(=O)N5C[C@@H](C[C@H]5C(=S)N(C)C)N6C=C(N=N6)CO
- InChI: InChI=1S/C31H36N10O3S/c1-19-11-20(29(43)39-15-22-14-33-38(4)28(22)34-25-7-5-6-8-26(25)39)9-10-21(19)13-32-31(44)40-17-24(12-27(40)30(45)37(2)3)41-16-23(18-42)35-36-41/h5-11,14,16,24,27,34,42H,12-13,15,17-18H2,1-4H3,(H,32,44)/t24-,27+/m1/s1; Key:QZVVCUZGIWAQFK-SQHAQQRYSA-N

LIT-002 is a small-molecule oxytocin receptor agonist which is under investigation for potential medical use, with possible indications including autism, drug addiction, and neuropathic pain.

== Pharmacology ==
=== Pharmacodynamics ===
LIT-002 is a highly potent full agonist of the oxytocin receptor, with an EC_{50} of 0.15 nM. It is an improved analogue of the earlier drug LIT-001, with 300-fold greater potency than LIT-001 and 2.6-fold greater potency than oxytocin as an oxytocin receptor agonist in vitro. The drug is the most potent oxytocin receptor agonist described to date. In addition to its oxytocin receptor agonism, LIT-002 is a highly potent agonist of the vasopressin V_{2} receptor (EC_{50} = 0.25 nM) and a very weak modulator of the vasopressin V_{1A} and V_{1B} receptors (EC_{50} = 966 nM and 760 nM, respectively). The drug is more selective for the oxytocin receptor over the vasopressin receptors than LIT-001.

LIT-002 enhances social interaction in multiple models of autism in rodents. In addition, it shows robust analgesic effects comparable to those of pregabalin in animal models of neuropathic pain in rodents. The drug did not affect spontaneous locomotor activity, indicating lack of sedation, and its effects in neuropathic pain models were reversed by a centrally active oxytocin receptor antagonist but not by a peripherally restricted oxytocin receptor antagonist. Due to its vasopressin V_{2} receptor agonism, LIT-002 produces antidiuretic effects. Vasopressin V_{2} receptor activation can cause hyponatremia and this can potentially be life-threatening. However, co-administration of urea with LIT-002 can counterbalance its off-target antidiuretic effects, and the effects are described as manageable.

=== Pharmacokinetics ===
LIT-002 is orally active in rodents. The drug's pharmacokinetics, for instance blood–brain barrier permeability, are not fully optimal, but it is nonetheless centrally active and with high potency. Small-molecule oxytocin receptor agonists like LIT-001 and LIT-002 have greatly improved pharmacokinetic and drug-like properties compared to oxytocin itself.

== Chemistry ==
The chemical synthesis of LIT-002 has been described. Various analogues of LIT-002 such as LIT-001 among others have been described.

== History and development ==
LIT-002 was patented in 2024 and was first described in the scientific literature by 2026. It was developed by Marcel Hibert and colleagues at the Laboratory for Therapeutic Innovation (LIT) at the University of Strasbourg in France and by the Centre National de la Recherche Scientifique (CNRS; French National Centre for Scientific Research). The drug is now being developed by the startup pharmaceutical company Occentis Pharmaceuticals. Potential therapeutic applications of LIT-002 include treatment of autism, alcoholism, opioid addiction, and neuropathic pain.

== See also ==
- Oxytocin receptor agonist
- List of investigational autism and pervasive developmental disorder drugs
