= WAY-267464 =

Chemical compound

Clinical data
- Other names: WAY267464; WAY-267,464
- Drug class: Oxytocin receptor agonist; Vasopressin V_{1A} receptor antagonist
- ATC code: None

Legal status
- Legal status: In general: uncontrolled

Identifiers
- IUPAC name: 4-(3,5-Dihydroxybenzyl)-N-(2-methyl-4-[(1-methyl-4,10-dihydropyrazolo[3,4-b][1,5]benzodiazepin-5(1H)-yl)carbonyl]benzyl)piperazine-1-carboxamide
- CAS Number: 847375-16-0
- PubChem CID: 9938214
- ChemSpider: 31047382
- UNII: XXL55X3DKM
- CompTox Dashboard (EPA): DTXSID30433044

Chemical and physical data
- Formula: C_{32}H_{35}N_{7}O_{4}
- Molar mass: 581.677 g·mol^{−1}
- 3D model (JSmol): Interactive image
- SMILES: OC1=CC(O)=CC(CN2CCN(C(NCC3=C(C)C=C(C(N4C5=CC=CC=C5NC6=C(C=NN6C)C4)=O)C=C3)=O)CC2)=C1
- InChI: InChI=1S/C32H35N7O4/c1-21-13-23(31(42)39-20-25-18-34-36(2)30(25)35-28-5-3-4-6-29(28)39)7-8-24(21)17-33-32(43)38-11-9-37(10-12-38)19-22-14-26(40)16-27(41)15-22/h3-8,13-16,18,35,40-41H,9-12,17,19-20H2,1-2H3,(H,33,43); Key:HWPGRFRXZNLZEX-UHFFFAOYSA-N

WAY-267464 is a potent, selective, non-peptide agonist for the oxytocin receptor, with negligible affinity for the vasopressin receptors. However, though originally described as selective for the oxytocin receptor and lacking affinity for the vasopressin receptors, it has since been reported to also act as a potent vasopressin V_{1A} receptor antagonist (in contrast to oxytocin, which is a weak agonist of the V_{1A} receptor). WAY-267464 has been shown to cross the blood–brain barrier to a significantly greater extent than exogenously applied oxytocin, and in animal tests produces centrally-mediated oxytocinergic actions such as anxiolytic effects, but with no antidepressant effect evident. It was developed by a team at Ferring Pharmaceuticals. WAY-267464 was under investigation for the potential clinical treatment of anxiety disorders by Wyeth, and reached the preclinical stage of development, but no development has been reported as of 2011.

== See also ==
- Oxytocin receptor agonist
- TC OT 39
- LIT-001
- KNX-100
