= Vasotocin =

Names
- IUPAC name 1-[(1R,4S,7S,13S,16R)-16-amino-4-(2-amino-2-oxoethyl)-7-(3-amino-3-oxopropyl)-10-[(2S)-butan-2-yl]-13-[(4-hydroxyphenyl)methyl]-3,6,9,12,15-pentaoxo-18,19-dithia-2,5,8,11,14-pentazacycloicosane-1-carbonyl]-N-[(2S)-1-[(2-amino-2-oxoethyl)amino]-5-(diaminomethylideneamino)-1-oxopentan-2-yl]pyrrolidine-2-carboxamide
- Other names Argiprestocin; Arg-vasotocin; 8-Arg-vasotocin; Arginine vasotocin

Identifiers
CAS Number	113-80-4
3D model (JSmol)	Interactive image
ChEBI	CHEBI:78364
ChEMBL	ChEMBL2370156
ChemSpider	8209627
ECHA InfoCard	100.245.670
EC Number	812-989-3
IUPHAR/BPS	2169
PubChem CID	68649
UNII	W6S6URY8OF
CompTox Dashboard (EPA)	DTXSID40873492
- InChI: InChI=1S/C43H67N15O12S2/c1-3-21(2)34-41(69)53-26(12-13-31(45)60)37(65)55-28(17-32(46)61)38(66)56-29(20-72-71-19-24(44)35(63)54-27(39(67)57-34)16-22-8-10-23(59)11-9-22)42(70)58-15-5-7-30(58)40(68)52-25(6-4-14-50-43(48)49)36(64)51-18-33(47)62/h8-11,21,24-30,34,59H,3-7,12-20,44H2,1-2H3,(H2,45,60)(H2,46,61)(H2,47,62)(H,51,64)(H,52,68)(H,53,69)(H,54,63)(H,55,65)(H,56,66)(H,57,67)(H4,48,49,50)/t21-,24-,25-,26-,27-,28-,29-,30-,34-/m0/s1 Key: OXDZADMCOWPSOC-BQGUCLBMSA-N
- SMILES: NC(=O)CNC(=O)[C@H](CCCN=C(N)N)NC(=O)C1CCCN1C(=O)[C@H]2NC(=O)[C@H](CC(=O)N)NC(=O)[C@H](CCC(=O)N)NC(=O)[C@H]([C@H](CC)C)NC(=O)[C@H](Cc3ccc(O)cc3)NC(=O)[C@@H](N)CSSC2

Properties
Chemical formula	C_{43}H_{67}N_{15}O_{12}S_{2}
Molar mass	1050.22 g·mol^{−1}
- Except where otherwise noted, data are given for materials in their standard state (at 25 °C [77 °F], 100 kPa). verify (what is ?) Infobox references

Vasotocin is an oligopeptide homologous to oxytocin and vasopressin found in all non-mammalian vertebrates (including birds, fishes, and amphibians) and possibly in mammals during the fetal stage of development. Arginine vasotocin (AVT), a hormone produced by neurosecretory cells within the posterior pituitary gland (neurohypophysis) of the brain, is a major endocrine regulator of water balance and osmotic homeostasis and is involved in social and sexual behavior in non-mammalian vertebrates. In mammals, it appears to have biological properties similar to those of oxytocin (stimulating reproductive tract contraction as in egg laying or birth) and vasopressin (diuretic and antidiuretic effects). It has been found to have effects on the regulation of REM sleep. Evidence for the existence of endogenous vasotocin in mammals is limited and no mammalian gene encoding vasotocin has been confirmed.

AVT (Cys-Tyr-Ile-Gln-Asn-Cys-Pro-Arg-Gly-NH2), which occurs in the lamprey, represents the ancestral form in the phylogeny of the vertebrate neurohypophysial hormones. Gene duplication and point mutation have produced two distinct lineages, one involved in reproduction (oxytocin-like peptides) and the other in osmoregulation (vasopressin-like peptides). These hormones have remained highly conserved throughout evolution. Each is a peptide of nine amino acids derived from a preprohormone precursor by proteolytic cleavage, with an intramolecular disulfide bridge between the cysteine (Cys) residues; the C-terminal glycine (Gly) residue is amidated. Six of the residues have been found to be invariant in homologous peptides from numerous species of vertebrates. The vasopressin-like peptides, which differ in positions 3 and/or 8, include AVT and the mammalian hormones arginine vasopressin (Cys-Tyr-Phe-Gln-Asn-Cys-Pro-Arg-Gly-NH2, with isoleucine-3 of AVT changed to phenylalanine) and lysine vasopressin (isoleucine-3 changed to phenylalanine and arginine-8 changed to lysine). The oxytocin-like peptides, which differ in positions 4 and/or 8, include oxytocin (Cys-Tyr-Ile-Gln-Asn-Cys-Pro-Leu-Gly-NH2, with arginine-8 of AVT changed to leucine), mesotocin (arginine-8 changed to isoleucine), and isotocin (glutamine-4 changed to serine and arginine-8 changed to isoleucine); they differ from the vasopressin-like peptides in having a neutral amino acid in place of a basic amino acid at position 8. Oxytocin occurs in placental mammals; mesotocin occurs in amphibians, reptiles, and birds, and isotocin occurs in fishes.

== Biosynthesis ==
AVT is synthesized as a preprohormone that includes a second peptide, neurophysin VT (neurophysins are carrier proteins that are secreted along with their passenger hormones); intracellular proteolytic processing generates the mature peptides. In the chicken (Gallus gallus), the 161-amino acid vasotocin-neurophysin VT preprohormone is encoded by the gene AVP, which is considered homologous to the mammalian genes encoding arginine vasopressin. Removal of the 19-amino acid N-terminal signal peptide generates the prohormone, which is hydrolysed to AVT (derived from amino acids 20–28) and neurophysin VT (derived from amino acids 32–161). The existence of two AVT preprohormones with different sequences in fishes (such as chum salmon, Oncorhynchus keta) is evidence for gene duplication.

== Physiological effects ==
AVT combines both antidiuretic and reproductive activities similar to those of oxytocin and vasopressin. The physiological actions of AVT in birds are mediated through diverse receptor subtypes VT1, VT2, VT3 and VT4. AVT and synthetic analogs injected into monkeys cause reabsorption of osmotically free water and changes in excretion of sodium and potassium ions in the kidneys. AVT produces distinct effects on the reproductive functions of male and female domestic chickens. In laying hens, AVT synthesised in magnocellular diencephalic neurons is released into circulation in a highly coordinated manner, contributing to the peripheral control of oviposition. In males, parvocellular AVT cells located in the limbic system (bed nucleus of stria terminalis) express AVT. This expression is sensitive to gonadal steroids and is correlated with sexual differentiation of masculine behavior such as courtship vocalization and copulation.

== Behavioral effects ==
Several animal studies have been conducted that explore the behavioral effects of AVT. The main findings of these studies have revealed that AVT plays an integral role in the pair bonding behavior and social hierarchy in non-mammalian vertebrates.

In a study conducted with zebra finches, increased levels of AVT were linked to an increase in aggressive, competitive behavior in non-paired male finches, but were subsequently related to an increase in defensive behavior after the finches had been paired. However, this study also found that blocking AVT receptors did not directly affect pair bonding ability. The shift in behaviors were explained by the location of the release of AVT in the brain. Competitive aggressive behavior was found to be linked with AVT release in the BSTm, whereas defensive, nest-protecting behavior was linked with AVT release in the neurons of the Hypothalamus and Paraventricular Nucleus.

In a study conducted with male Japanese quail, AVT was found to have an effect on later social interactions amongst the species. Immediately after injection with AVT, the quails displayed less aggressive behavior (pecking). However, the next day, the quail that were injected with AVT displayed more dominant behavior towards familiar birds, but not unfamiliar birds. This study shows that AVT may play a role in establishing social hierarchy.

A study that investigated the role of social construction and AVT compared territorial and non-territorial species of tropical coral reef fish. Experimenters administered Manning compound, an AVT agonist to the fish and found that, after treatment, non-territorial species displayed more territorial behavior whereas territorial species displayed less territorial behavior.

Research suggests that the effects of AVT on aggression may be influenced by the social construction of the species. For example, in a study done with Rainbow Trout, increased levels of AVT were associated with more subordinate behavior. It is currently hypothesized that the contrasting effects of AVT are related to the distinction between territorial versus colonial social systems. In a territorial species, such as Rainbow Trout, AVT is linked to less dominant behavior. This may be due to the differences in the distribution of AVT receptors in territorial and colonial species.
