= Oxytocin (medication) =

Medication made from the peptide oxytocin

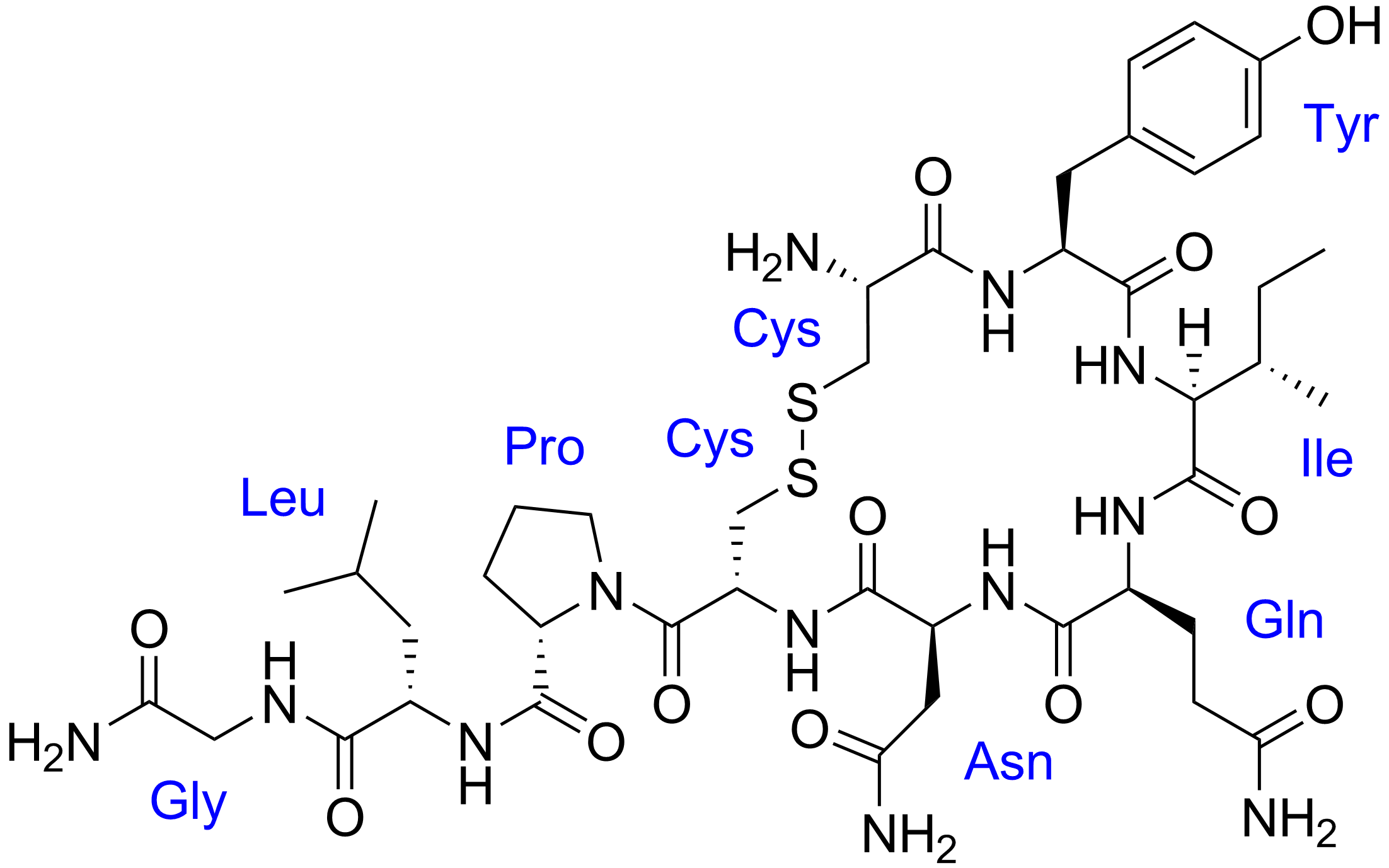

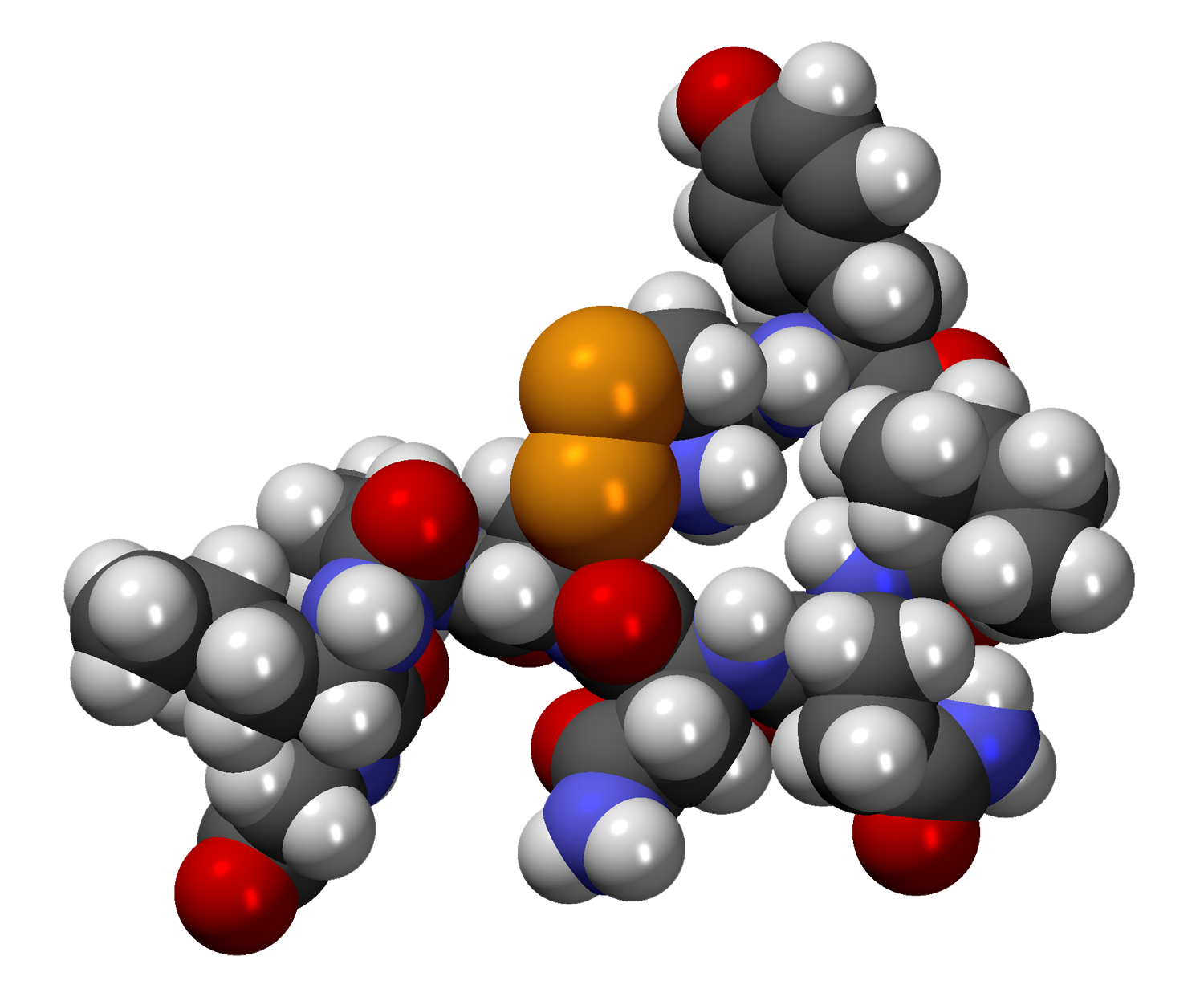

Clinical data
- Pronunciation: /ˌɒksɪˈtoʊsɪn/ OK-sih-TOH-sin
- Trade names: Pitocin, Syntocinon, Viatocinon, others
- AHFS/Drugs.com: Monograph
- MedlinePlus: a682685
- License data: US DailyMed: Oxytocin
- Pregnancy category: AU: A
- Routes of administration: Intranasal, intravenous, intramuscular
- Drug class: Oxytocin receptor agonist
- ATC code: H01BB02 (WHO)

Legal status
- Legal status: UK: POM (Prescription only); US: ℞-only

Pharmacokinetic data
- Metabolism: Liver and elsewhere (via oxytocinases)
- Elimination half-life: 1–6 min (IV); ~2 h (intranasal)
- Excretion: Bile duct and kidney

Identifiers
- IUPAC name: 1-({(4R,7S,10S,13S,16S,19R)-19-amino-7-(2-amino-2-oxoethyl)-10-(3-amino-3-oxopropyl)-16-(4-hydroxybenzyl)-13-[(1S)-1-methylpropyl]-6,9,12,15,18-pentaoxo-1,2-dithia-5,8,11,14,17-pentaazacycloicosan-4-yl}carbonyl)-L-prolyl-L-leucylglycinamide
- CAS Number: 50-56-6
- PubChem CID: 439302
- IUPHAR/BPS: 2174
- DrugBank: DB00107
- ChemSpider: 388434
- UNII: 1JQS135EYN
- KEGG: D00089
- ChEBI: CHEBI:7872
- ChEMBL: ChEMBL395429

Chemical and physical data
- Formula: C_{43}H_{66}N_{12}O_{12}S_{2}
- Molar mass: 1007.19 g·mol^{−1}
- 3D model (JSmol): Interactive image
- SMILES: CC[C@H](C)[C@@H]1NC(=O)[C@H](Cc2ccc(O)cc2)NC(=O)[C@@H](N)CSSC[C@H](NC(=O)[C@H](CC(N)=O)NC(=O)[C@H](CCC(N)=O)NC1=O)C(=O)N3CCC[C@H]3C(=O)N[C@@H](CC(C)C)C(=O)NCC(N)=O
- InChI: InChI=1S/C43H66N12O12S2/c1-5-22(4)35-42(66)49-26(12-13-32(45)57)38(62)51-29(17-33(46)58)39(63)53-30(20-69-68-19-25(44)36(60)50-28(40(64)54-35)16-23-8-10-24(56)11-9-23)43(67)55-14-6-7-31(55)41(65)52-27(15-21(2)3)37(61)48-18-34(47)59/h8-11,21-22,25-31,35,56H,5-7,12-20,44H2,1-4H3,(H2,45,57)(H2,46,58)(H2,47,59)(H,48,61)(H,49,66)(H,50,60)(H,51,62)(H,52,65)(H,53,63)(H,54,64)/t22-,25-,26-,27-,28-,29-,30-,31-,35-/m0/s1; Key:XNOPRXBHLZRZKH-DSZYJQQASA-N

Synthetic oxytocin, sold under the brand name Pitocin among others, is a medication made from the peptide oxytocin. As a medication, it is used to cause contraction of the uterus to start labor, increase the speed of labor, and to stop bleeding following delivery. For this purpose, it is given by injection either into a muscle or into a vein.

Oxytocin is also available in intranasal spray form for psychiatric, endocrine and weight management use as a supplement. Intranasal oxytocin works on a different pathway than injected oxytocin, primarily along the olfactory nerve crossing the blood–brain barrier to the olfactory lobe in the brain, where dense magnocellular oxytocin neurons receive the nerve impulse quickly.

The natural occurrence of oxytocin was discovered in 1906. It is on the World Health Organization's List of Essential Medicines.

== Medical uses ==
An intravenous infusion of oxytocin is used to induce labor and to support labor in case of slow childbirth if the oxytocin challenge test fails. The physiology of labor stimulated by oxytocin administration is similar to the physiology of spontaneous labor. It is associated with less tachysystole (more than five contractions in 10 minutes, averaged over a 30-minute period, which can but does not always cause fetal distress) than other induction methods and allows achievement of delivery with amniotomy to proceed faster. Whether a high dose is better than a standard dose for labor induction is unclear. It has largely replaced ergometrine as the principal agent to increase uterine tone in acute postpartum hemorrhage. Oxytocin is also used in veterinary medicine to facilitate birth and to stimulate milk release.

The tocolytic agent atosiban (Tractocile) acts as an antagonist of oxytocin receptors. It is registered in many countries for use in suppressing premature labor between 24 and 33 weeks of gestation. It has fewer side effects than drugs previously used for this purpose (such as ritodrine, salbutamol and terbutaline).

Oxytocin has not been found to be useful for improving breastfeeding success.

== Contraindications ==
Oxytocin injection (synthetic) is contraindicated in any of these conditions:

- Substantial cephalopelvic disproportion
- Unfavorable fetal position or presentation (e.g., transverse lies) undeliverable without conversion before delivery
- Obstetric emergencies where maternal or fetal risk-to-benefit ratio favors surgery
- Fetal distress when delivery is not imminent
- Umbilical cord prolapse
- Uterine activity fails to progress adequately
- Hyperactive or hypertonic uterus
- Vaginal delivery is contraindicated (e.g., invasive cervical carcinoma, active genital herpes infection, total placenta previa, vasa previa, cord presentation or prolapse)
- Uterine or cervical scarring from previous cesarean section or major cervical or uterine (e.g., transfundal) surgery
- Unengaged fetal head
- History of hypersensitivity to oxytocin or any ingredient in the formulation

== Side effects ==
Oxytocin is relatively safe when used at recommended doses, and side effects are uncommon. These maternal events have been reported:

- Subarachnoid hemorrhage
- Increased blood pressure when combined with other medications that raise blood pressure, particularly when used prior to administering epidural anesthesia
- Cardiac arrhythmia including increased or decreased heart rate, and premature ventricular contraction
- Impaired uterine blood flow or excessive uterine contractions when combined with other medications that cause uterine contraction (carboprost, misoprostol)
- Uterine rupture
- Afibrinogenemia
- Anaphylaxis
- Nausea and vomiting
- Changes in fetal blood flow

Many of these side effects are unable to be differentiated from the risks of normal labor versus oxytocin administration itself.

Oxytocin during labour is associated with a significantly higher risk of severe postpartum hemorrhagic when prophylactic oxytocin is not also given after delivery.

Excessive dosage or long-term administration (over a period of 24 hours or longer) has been known to result in tetanic uterine contractions, uterine rupture, sometimes fatal. Water intoxication may be exhibited in administration through symptoms such as seizures, comas, neonatal jaundice, and potential fatality. Managed fluid intake and consistent monitoring of sodium levels has been researched as crucial in the safe administration of oxytocin.

The use of oxytocin during childbirth has been linked to an increased need for other medical interventions, most primarily, through the administration of an epidural anaesthetic. This has been documented as creating a 'cascade effect', potentially causing detrimental impacts to the birthing process. Oxytocin administration also, conversely, decreases the rate of cesarean sections. Use of oxytocin has been found to significantly shorten labor duration. Early oxytocin augmentation has also been found to increase the probability of spontaneous vaginal delivery and reduce the risk of chorioamnionitis or intrauterine infection.

Since a landmark investigation was published in JAMA Pediatrics by researchers in 2013, the potential link between oxytocin use during childbirth and increased risks of Autism Spectrum Disorder (ASD) in children's development has been a topic of debate. There is no robust evidence in support of oxytocin causing ASD or other neurodevelopmental disorders.

Oxytocin was added to the Institute for Safe Medication Practices's list of High Alert Medications in Acute Care Settings in 2012. The list includes medications that have a high risk for harm if administered incorrectly.

During pregnancy, increased uterine motility has led to decreased heart rate, cardiac arrhythmia, seizures, brain damage, and death in the fetus or neonate. Increased uterine motility is a hallmark of both spontaneous labor and induced labor, therefore the risks associated with uterine motility are not specific to this medication.

Use is linked to an increased risk of postpartum depression in the mother.

Certain learning and memory functions are impaired by centrally administered oxytocin. Also, systemic oxytocin administration can impair memory retrieval in certain aversive memory tasks. However, oxytocin does seem to facilitate learning and memory specifically for social information. Healthy males administered intranasal oxytocin show improved memory for human faces, in particular happy faces.

== Pharmacodynamics ==
In addition to its oxytocin receptor agonism, oxytocin has been found to act as a positive allosteric modulator (PAM) of the μ- and κ-opioid receptors and this may be involved in its analgesic effects.

== Pharmacokinetics ==
=== Routes of administration ===
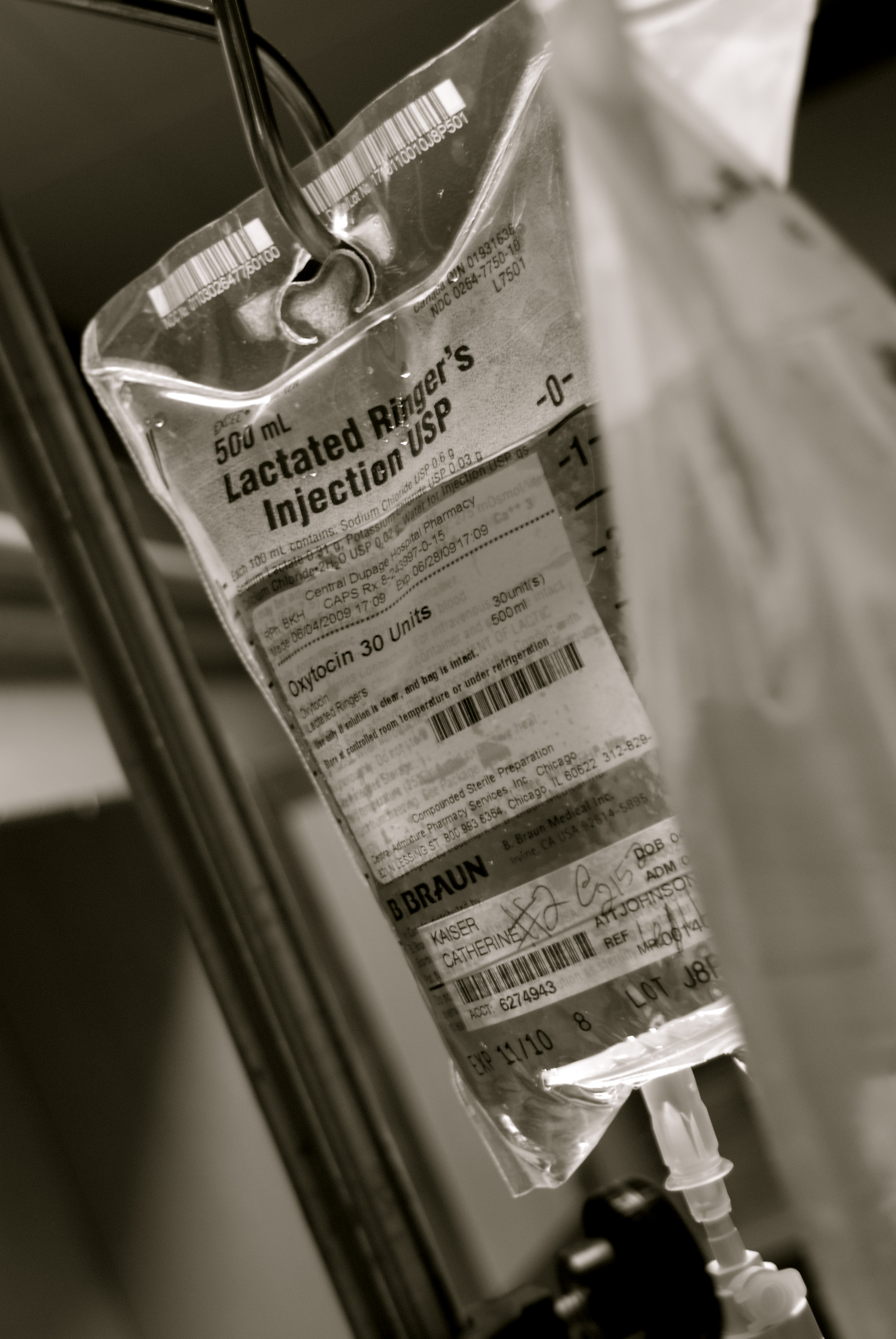
A bag of oxytocin for intravenous infusion

One IU of oxytocin is the equivalent of about 1.68 μg or mcg of pure peptide.

- Injection: Clinical doses of oxytocin are given by injection either into a muscle or into a vein to cause contraction of the uterus. Very small amounts (< 1%) do appear to enter the central nervous system in humans when peripherally administered. The compound has a half-life of typically about 3 minutes in the blood when given intravenously. Intravenous administration requires 40 minutes to reach a steady-state concentration and achieve maximum uterine contraction response.
- Buccal: Oxytocin was delivered in buccal tablets, but this is not common practice any more.
- Under the tongue: Oxytocin is poorly absorbed sublingually.
- Nasal administration: Oxytocin is effectively distributed to the brain when administered intranasally via a nasal spray, after which it reliably crosses the blood–brain barrier and exhibits psychoactive effects in humans. No serious adverse effects with short-term application of oxytocin with 18~40 IU (36–80 mcg) have been recorded. Intranasal oxytocin has a central duration of at least 2.25 hours and as long as 4 hours.
- Oral: While it was originally assumed that oxytocin administered orally would be destroyed in the gastrointestinal tract, studies have shown that oxytocin is transported by the immunoglobulin RAGE (receptor for advanced glycation end products) across the intestinal epithelium and into the blood. Orally-administered oxytocin has been shown to increase putamen responses to facial emotions in humans. Oxytocin administered orally produces different effects on human behaviour and brain function than when given intranasally, possibly due to variations in the molecular transport and binding mechanisms.

== Chemistry ==
Peptide analogues of oxytocin with similar actions, for example carbetocin (Duratocin) and demoxytocin (Sandopart), have been developed and marketed for medical use. In addition, small-molecule oxytocin receptor agonists, like TC OT 39, WAY-267464, and LIT-001 have been developed and studied. However, lack of selectivity over vasopressin receptors has so far limited the potential usefulness of small-molecule oxytocin receptor agonists.

== History ==
Oxytocin's uterine-contracting properties were discovered by British pharmacologist Henry Hallett Dale in 1906. Oxytocin's milk ejection property was described by Ott and Scott in 1910 and by Schafer and Mackenzie in 1911.

Oxytocin was the first polypeptide hormone to be sequenced or synthesized. Du Vigneaud was awarded the Nobel Prize in 1955 for his work.

=== Etymology ===
The word oxytocin was coined from the term oxytocic. Greek ὀξύς, oxys, and τόκος, tokos, meaning "quick birth".

== Society and culture ==
=== Counterfeits ===
In African and Asian countries, some oxytocin products were found to be counterfeit medications.

== Other uses ==
The trust-inducing property of oxytocin might help those with social anxiety and depression, anxiety, fear, and social dysfunctions, such as generalized anxiety disorder, post-traumatic stress disorder, and social anxiety disorder, as well as autism and schizophrenia, among others. However, a 2013 meta-analysis found only autism spectrum disorder showed a significant combined effect size. A 2022 study found an indication of an effect among autistic children aged 3–5, but not among autistic children aged 5-12.

People using oxytocin show improved recognition for positive social cues over threatening social cues and improved recognition of fear.

- Autism: Oxytocin may play a role in autism and may be an effective treatment for autism's repetitive and affiliative behaviors.
- Relationship counseling: The use of oxytocin in relationship counseling for well-being has been suggested.
- Post-traumatic stress disorder: It has been suggested that oxytocin may be a safer option than MDMA for the treatment of PTSD, although oxytocin has less evidence of efficacy.

== See also ==
- Oxytocin receptor agonist
- List of investigational anxiolytics
- List of investigational sexual dysfunction drugs
- Oxytocin deficiency
