= LIT-001 =

Small-molecule oxytocin receptor agonist

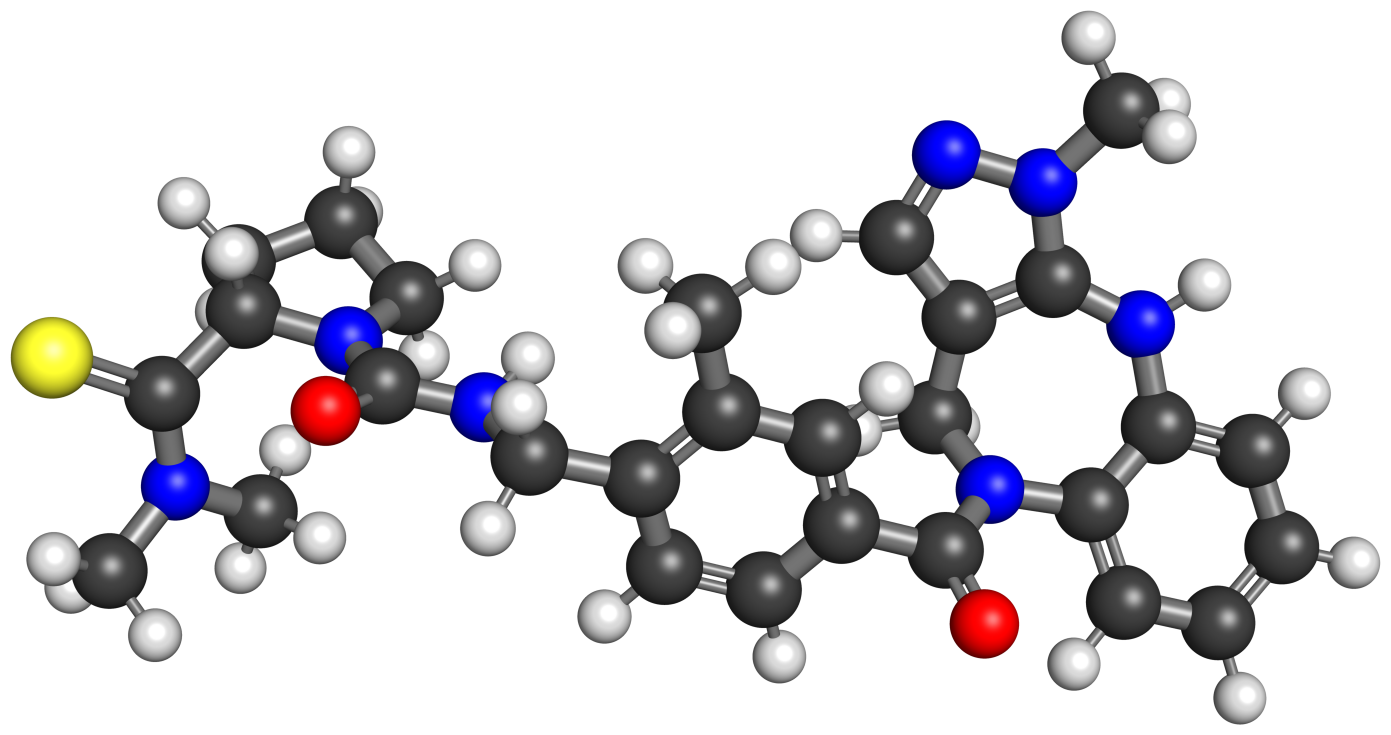

Clinical data
- Other names: LIT001
- Drug class: Oxytocin receptor agonist; Vasopressin V_{2} receptor agonist

Identifiers
- IUPAC name: (2S)-2-(dimethylcarbamothioyl)-N-[[2-methyl-4-(1-methyl-4,10-dihydropyrazolo[4,3-c][1,5]benzodiazepine-5-carbonyl)phenyl]methyl]pyrrolidine-1-carboxamide
- CAS Number: 2245072-20-0
- PubChem CID: 145711714
- ChemSpider: 77006318
- UNII: Y6596259AE
- ChEMBL: ChEMBL4204210

Chemical and physical data
- Formula: C_{28}H_{33}N_{7}O_{2}S
- Molar mass: 531.68 g·mol^{−1}
- 3D model (JSmol): Interactive image
- SMILES: CC1=C(C=CC(=C1)C(=O)N2CC3=C(NC4=CC=CC=C42)N(N=C3)C)CNC(=O)N5CCC[C@H]5C(=S)N(C)C
- InChI: InChI=1S/C28H33N7O2S/c1-18-14-19(11-12-20(18)15-29-28(37)34-13-7-10-24(34)27(38)32(2)3)26(36)35-17-21-16-30-33(4)25(21)31-22-8-5-6-9-23(22)35/h5-6,8-9,11-12,14,16,24,31H,7,10,13,15,17H2,1-4H3,(H,29,37)/t24-/m0/s1; Key:AOPORIRPXVMWSL-DEOSSOPVSA-N

LIT-001 is a small-molecule oxytocin receptor agonist and vasopressin receptor mixed agonist and antagonist that was first described in the literature in 2018. Along with TC OT 39 and WAY-267464, it is one of the first small-molecule oxytocin receptor agonists to have been developed. LIT-001 has greatly improved pharmacokinetic properties relative to oxytocin, reduces social deficits in animal models, and may have potential use in the treatment of social disorders like autism in humans. It is or was undergoing formal clinical development for such uses.

== Pharmacology ==
LIT-001 has greater selectivity for the oxytocin receptor over the vasopressin V_{1A} receptor than the related compounds TC OT 39 and WAY-267464. It shows antagonism of the V_{1A} receptor only at high concentrations. LIT-001 additionally acts as an agonist of the vasopressin V_{2} receptor, with this action occurring at similar concentrations as for the oxytocin receptor. This is unlikely to influence the oxytocin receptor-related behavioral effects of LIT-001, as V_{2} receptors are not expressed in the brain. However, it may influence fluid homeostasis, analogously to vasopressin. Vasopressin V_{2} receptor activation can cause hyponatremia and this can potentially be life-threatening.

Given via peripheral administration, LIT-001 reduces social deficits in a mouse model of autism, specifically the μ-opioid receptor knockout mouse model. It was the first small-molecule oxytocin receptor agonist to be shown to reduce social dysfunction in animals. LIT-001 shows blood–brain barrier permeability and has a relatively long elimination half-life in rodents, giving it an advantageous drug profile relative to peptide oxytocin receptor agonists like oxytocin. In the case of oxytocin, the amount estimated to enter the cerebrospinal fluid is only 0.002% with subcutaneous injection and at most 0.005% with intranasal administration, its half-life is only about 20 to 60 minutes, and it is not orally bioavailable, all of which greatly limit its potential usefulness as a central nervous system-acting medication. These limitations of oxytocin may underlie limited effectiveness with oxytocin nasal spray in clinical trials. Based on its positive social effects in animal models and its favorable pharmacokinetic properties, LIT-001 may have potential as a therapeutic agent in the treatment of social disorders in humans.

The affinity (K_{i}) of LIT-001 for the human oxytocin receptor, where it acts as an agonist, is 61 to 226 nM, and its half maximal effective concentration (EC_{50}) is 25 nM. At the human vasopressin V_{1A} receptor, where LIT-001 is an antagonist, its affinity (K_{i}) and half maximal inhibitory concentration (IC_{50}) are 1,253 nM and 5,900 nM, respectively. Finally, at the human vasopressin V_{2} receptor, where the drug functions as an agonist, its affinity (K_{i}) and EC_{50} are 1,666 nM and 41 nM, respectively. Based on the preceding EC_{50} and IC_{50} values, LIT-001 shows 236-fold selectivity for activating the oxytocin receptor over antagonizing the V_{1A} receptor, whereas it has no appreciable selectivity for activating the oxytocin receptor over activating the V_{2} receptor (only 1.64-fold greater preference).

== Chemistry ==
LIT-001 is a small-molecule compound with the molecular formula C_{28}H_{33}N_{7}O_{2}S, a molecular weight of 531.7 g/mol, and a predicted log P of 1.95 to 2.8. It is similar in structure to the earlier small-molecule oxytocin receptor agonists TC OT 39 and WAY-267,464.

== History and development ==
LIT-001 was first described in the scientific literature in 2018. It was developed by Marcel Hibert and colleagues at the Laboratory for Therapeutic Innovation (LIT) at the University of Strasbourg in France and by the Centre National de la Recherche Scientifique (French National Centre for Scientific Research). Hibert had spent 20 years studying oxytocin before finally identifying LIT-001, a synthetic small-molecule oxytocin receptor agonist with favorable pharmacokinetic properties and effects. The drug is being formally developed for potential treatment of autistic spectrum disorders. It is in the preclinical research stage of development for this indication.

LIT-002 chemical structure.

Hibert has disclosed that other more potent and selective small-molecule oxytocin receptor agonists have also since been discovered by his research group. Formal development of these compounds is now being pursued. In 2024, a new highly potent oxytocin receptor agonist called LIT-002 was described and is being developed by a new pharmaceutical company called Occentis Pharmaceuticals. Potential therapeutic applications include treatment of autism, alcoholism and opioid addiction, and neuropathic pain.

== See also ==
- Oxytocin receptor agonist
- List of investigational autism and pervasive developmental disorder drugs
- LIT-002 and KNX-100
