= Atosiban =

Chemical compound

Clinical data
- Trade names: Tractocile, Antocin, others
- AHFS/Drugs.com: UK Drug Information
- License data: EU EMA: by INN
- Routes of administration: Intravenous
- ATC code: G02CX01 (WHO)

Legal status
- Legal status: AU: S4 (Prescription only); UK: POM (Prescription only); EU: Rx-only; In general: ℞ (Prescription only)

Identifiers
- IUPAC name: 1-(3-Mercaptopropanoic acid)- 2-(O-ethyl-D-tyrosine)-4-L-threonine- 8-L-ornithine-oxytocin
- CAS Number: 90779-69-4
- PubChem CID: 5311010
- IUPHAR/BPS: 2213
- DrugBank: DB09059
- ChemSpider: 4470550
- UNII: 081D12SI0Z
- KEGG: D03008
- ChEMBL: ChEMBL378642
- CompTox Dashboard (EPA): DTXSID8048991
- ECHA InfoCard: 100.234.128

Chemical and physical data
- Formula: C_{43}H_{67}N_{11}O_{12}S_{2}
- Molar mass: 994.19 g·mol^{−1}
- 3D model (JSmol): Interactive image
- SMILES: O=C(N)CNC(=O)[C@@H](NC(=O)[C@H]3N(C(=O)[C@H]1NC(=O)[C@@H](NC(=O)[C@@H](NC(=O)[C@@H](NC(=O)[C@H](NC(=O)CCSSC1)Cc2ccc(OCC)cc2)[C@@H](C)CC)[C@H](O)C)CC(=O)N)CCC3)CCCN
- InChI: InChI=1S/C43H67N11O12S2/c1-5-23(3)35-41(63)53-36(24(4)55)42(64)50-29(20-32(45)56)38(60)51-30(43(65)54-17-8-10-31(54)40(62)49-27(9-7-16-44)37(59)47-21-33(46)57)22-68-67-18-15-34(58)48-28(39(61)52-35)19-25-11-13-26(14-12-25)66-6-2/h11-14,23-24,27-31,35-36,55H,5-10,15-22,44H2,1-4H3,(H2,45,56)(H2,46,57)(H,47,59)(H,48,58)(H,49,62)(H,50,64)(H,51,60)(H,52,61)(H,53,63)/t23-,24+,27-,28+,29-,30-,31-,35-,36-/m0/s1; Key:VWXRQYYUEIYXCZ-OBIMUBPZSA-N

Atosiban, sold under the brand name Tractocile among others, is an inhibitor of the hormones oxytocin and vasopressin. It is used as an intravenous medication as a labour repressant (tocolytic) to halt premature labor. It was developed by Ferring Pharmaceuticals in Sweden and first reported in the literature in 1985. Originally marketed by Ferring Pharmaceuticals, it is licensed in proprietary and generic forms for the delay of imminent preterm birth in pregnant adult women.

The most commonly reported side effect is nausea.

== Medical uses ==
Atosiban is used to delay birth in adult women who are 24 to 33 weeks pregnant, when they show signs that they may give birth pre-term (prematurely). These signs include regular contractions lasting at least 30 seconds at a rate of at least four every 30 minutes, and dilation of the cervix (the neck of the womb) of 1 to 3 cm and an effacement (a measure of the thinness of the cervix) of 50% or more. In addition, the baby must have a normal heart rate.

== Pharmacology ==
=== Mechanism of action ===
Atosiban is a nonapeptide, desamino-oxytocin analogue, and a competitive vasopressin/oxytocin receptor antagonist (VOTra). Atosiban inhibits the oxytocin-mediated release of inositol trisphosphate from the myometrial cell membrane. As a result, reduced release of intracellular, stored calcium from the sarcoplasmic reticulum of myometrial cells and reduced influx of Ca^{2+} from the extracellular space through voltage-gated channels occur. In addition, atosiban suppresses oxytocin-mediated release of PGE and PGF from the decidua.

In human preterm labour, atosiban, at the recommended dosage, antagonises uterine contractions and induces uterine quiescence. The onset of uterus relaxation following atosiban is rapid, uterine contractions being significantly reduced within 10 minutes to achieve stable uterine quiescence.

== Other uses ==
=== Atosiban use after assisted reproduction ===
Atosiban is useful in improving the pregnancy outcome of in vitro fertilization-embryo transfer (IVF-ET) in patients with repeated implantation failure. The pregnancy rate improved from zero to 43.7%.

First- and second-trimester bleeding was more prevalent in ART than in spontaneous pregnancies. From 2004 to 2010, 33 first-trimester pregnancies with vaginal bleeding after ART with evident uterine contractions, when using atosiban and/or ritodrine, no preterm delivery occurred before 30 weeks.

In a 2010 meta-analysis, nifedipine is superior to β_{2} adrenergic receptor agonists and magnesium sulfate for tocolysis in women with preterm labor (20–36 weeks), but it has been assigned to pregnancy category C by the U.S. Food and Drug Administration, so is not recommended before 20 weeks, or in the first trimester. A report from 2011 supports the use of atosiban, even at very early pregnancy, to decrease the frequency of uterine contractions to enhance success of pregnancy.

== Pharmacovigilance ==
Following the launch of atosiban in 2000, the calculated cumulative patient exposure to atosiban (January 2000 to December 2005) is estimated as 156,468 treatment cycles. To date, routine monitoring of drug safety has revealed no major safety issues.

== Regulatory affairs ==
Atosiban was approved in the European Union in January 2000 and launched in the European Union in April 2000. As of June 2007, atosiban was approved in 67 countries, excluding the United States and Japan. It was understood that Ferring did not expect to seek approval for atosiban in the US or Japan, focusing instead on development of new compounds for use in Spontaneous Preterm Labor (SPTL). The fact that atosiban only had a short duration before it was out of patent that the parent drug company decided not to pursue licensing in the US.

== Systematic reviews ==
In a systematic review of atosiban for tocolysis in preterm labour, six clinical studies — two compared atosiban to placebo and four atosiban to a β agonist — showed a significant increase in the proportion of women undelivered by 48 hours in women receiving atosiban compared to placebo. When compared with β agonists, atosiban increased the proportion of women undelivered by 48 hours and was safer compared to β agonists. Therefore, oxytocin antagonists appear to be effective and safe for tocolysis in preterm labour.

A 2014 systematic review by the Cochrane Collaboration showed that while atosiban had fewer side effects than alternative drugs (such as ritodrine), other beta blockers, and calcium channel antagonists, it was no better than placebo in the major outcomes i.e. pregnancy prolongation or neonatal outcomes. The finding of an increase in infant deaths in one placebo-controlled trial warrants caution. Further research is recommended.

=== Clinical trials ===
==== Atosiban vs. nifedipine ====
A 2013 retrospective study comparing the efficacy and safety of atosiban and nifedipine in the suppression of preterm labour concluded that atosiban and nifedipine are effective in delaying delivery for seven days or more in women presenting with preterm labour. A total of 68.3% of women in the atosiban group remained undelivered at seven days or more, compared with 64.7% in the nifedipine group. They have the same efficacy and associated minor side effects. However, flushing, palpitation, and hypotension were significantly higher in the nifedipine group.

A 2012 clinical trial compared tocolytic efficacy and tolerability of atosiban with that of nifedipine. Forty-eight (68.6%) women allocated to atosiban and 39 (52%) to nifedipine did not deliver and did not require an alternate agent at 48 hours, respectively (p=.03). Atosiban has fewer failures within 48 hours. Nifedipine may be associated with a longer postponement of delivery.

A 2009 randomised controlled study demonstrated for the first time the direct effects of atosiban on fetal movement, heart rate, and blood flow. Tocolysis with either atosiban or nifedipine combined with betamethasone administration had no direct fetal adverse effects.

==== Atosiban vs. ritodrine ====
Multicentre, controlled trial of atosiban vs. ritodrine in 128 women shows a significantly better tocolytic efficacy after 7 days in the atosiban group than in the ritodrine group (60.3 versus 34.9%), but not at 48 hours (68.3 versus 58.7%). Maternal adverse events were reported less frequently in the atosiban group (7.9 vs 70.8%), resulting in fewer early drug terminations due to adverse events (0 versus 20%). Therefore, atosiban is superior to ritodrine in the treatment of preterm labour.

== See also ==
- Oxytocin receptor antagonist
