= Vasopressin receptor =

G protein-coupled receptor

arginine vasopressin receptor 1A

Identifiers
- Symbol: AVPR1A
- Alt. symbols: AVPR1
- NCBI gene: 552
- HGNC: 895
- OMIM: 600821
- RefSeq: NM_000706
- UniProt: P37288

Other data
- Locus: Chr. 12 q14-q15
Search for
- Structures: Swiss-model
- Domains: InterPro

arginine vasopressin receptor 1B

Identifiers
- Symbol: AVPR1B
- Alt. symbols: AVPR3
- NCBI gene: 553
- HGNC: 896
- OMIM: 600264
- RefSeq: NM_000707
- UniProt: P47901

Other data
- Locus: Chr. 1 q32
Search for
- Structures: Swiss-model
- Domains: InterPro

arginine vasopressin receptor 2

Identifiers
- Symbol: AVPR2
- Alt. symbols: DIR3, DIR
- NCBI gene: 897
- HGNC: 897
- OMIM: 300538
- RefSeq: NM_000054
- UniProt: P30518

Other data
- Locus: Chr. X q28
Search for
- Structures: Swiss-model
- Domains: InterPro

The actions of vasopressin are mediated by stimulation of tissue-specific G protein-coupled receptors (GPCRs) called vasopressin receptors that are classified into the V_{1} (V_{1A}), V_{2}, and V_{3} (V_{1B}) receptor subtypes. These three subtypes differ in localization, function and signal transduction mechanisms.

== Subtypes ==
There are three subtypes of vasopressin receptor: V_{1A} (V_{1}), V_{1B} (V_{3}) and V_{2}.

Subtype (symbol)			Signaling pathways	Location	Function
gene	receptor		Signaling pathways	Location	Function
gene	IUPHAR	alternate	Signaling pathways	Location	Function
AVPR1A	V_{1A}	V_{1}	G protein-coupled, phosphatidylinositol/calcium	vascular smooth muscle, platelet, hepatocytes, myometrium	vasoconstriction, myocardial hypertrophy, platelet aggregation, glycogenolysis, uterine contraction
AVPR1B	V_{1B}	V_{3}	G protein-coupled, phosphatidylinositol/calcium	anterior pituitary gland	releases ACTH, prolactin, endorphins
AVPR2	V_{2}	V_{2}	Adenylyl cyclase/cAMP	basolateral membrane of collecting duct, vascular endothelium and vascular smooth muscle cell	insertion of AQP-2 water channels into apical membrane, induction of AQP-2 synthesis, releases von Willebrand factor and factor VIII, vasodilation

=== V_{1} receptor ===
V_{1} receptors (V_{1}Rs) are found in high density on vascular smooth muscle and cause vasoconstriction by an increase in intracellular calcium via the phosphatidyl–inositol-bisphosphate cascade. Cardiac myocytes also possess V_{1}R. Additionally V_{1}R are located in brain, testis, superior cervical ganglion, liver, blood vessels, and renal medulla.

V_{1}R is present on platelets, which upon stimulation induces an increase in intracellular calcium, facilitating thrombosis. Studies have indicated that due to polymorphism of platelet V_{1}R there is significant heterogeneity in the aggregation response of normal human platelets to vasopressin.

V_{1}Rs are found in kidney, where they occur in high density on medullary interstitial cells, vasa recta, and epithelial cells of the collecting duct. Vasopressin acts on medullary vasculature through V_{1}R to reduce blood flow to inner medulla without affecting blood flow to outer medulla. V_{1}Rs on the luminal membrane of the collecting duct limit the antidiuretic action of vasopressin. Additionally, vasopressin selectively contracts efferent arterioles probably through the V_{1}R, but not the afferent arteriole.

=== V_{2} receptor ===
V_{2} receptor (V_{2}R) differs from V_{1}R primarily in the number of sites susceptible to N-linked glycosylation; the V_{1}R has sites at both the amino-terminus and at the extracellular loop, whereas the V_{2}R has a single site at the extracellular amino-terminus.

The well known antidiuretic effect of vasopressin occurs via activation of V_{2}R. Vasopressin regulates water excretion from the kidney by increasing the osmotic water permeability of the renal collecting duct – an effect that is explained by coupling of the V_{2}R with the G_{s} signaling pathway, which activates cAMP. The V_{2}R continues to activate G_{s} after being internalized by β-arrestin rather than being desensitized. This internalized G_{s} signaling by V_{2}R is explained by the receptors ability to form "mega-complexes" consisting of a single V_{2}R, β-arrestin, and heterotrimeric G_{s}. The increased intracellular cAMP in the kidney in turn triggers fusion of aquaporin-2-bearing vesicles with the apical plasma membrane of the collecting duct principal cells, increasing water reabsorption.

=== V_{3} receptor ===
The human V_{3} receptor (V_{3}R, previously known as V_{1B}R) is a G-protein-coupled pituitary receptor that, because of its scarcity, was only recently characterized. The 424-amino-acid sequence of the V_{3}R has homologies of 45%, 39%, and 45% with the V_{1}R, V_{2}R and oxytocin receptor (OTR), respectively. However, V_{3}R has a pharmacologic profile that distinguishes it from the human V_{1}R and activates several signaling pathways via different G-proteins, depending on the level of receptor expression.

== Function ==
Although all three of these proteins are G-protein coupled receptors (GPCRs), activation of AVPR1A and AVPR1B stimulate phospholipase C, while activation of AVPR2 stimulates adenylate cyclase. These three receptors for vasopressin have unique tissue distributions. AVPR1A are expressed in vascular smooth muscle cells, hepatocytes, platelets, brain cells, and uterus cells. AVPR1B are expressed in cells of the anterior pituitary and throughout the brain, especially in the pyramidal neurons of the hippocampal CA2 field. AVPR2 are expressed in the kidney tubule, predominantly in the distal convoluted tubule and collecting ducts, in fetal lung tissue and lung cancer, the last two being associated with alternative splicing. AVPR2 is also expressed in the liver where stimulation releases a variety of clotting factors into the bloodstream. In the kidney, AVPR2's primary function is to respond to arginine vasopressin by stimulating mechanisms that concentrate the urine and maintain water homeostasis in the organism. When the function of AVPR2 is lost, the disease Nephrogenic Diabetes Insipidus (NDI) results.

== Ligands ==
=== Agonists ===
Vasopressin is the prototypical vasopressin receptor agonist.

=== Antagonists ===
Vasopressin receptor antagonists (VRAs) are drugs that block vasopressin receptors. Most commonly VRAs are used to treat hyponatremia caused by syndrome of inappropriate antidiuretic hormone secretion (SIADH), congestive heart failure (CHF) and cirrhosis.

Somatostatin is a competitive inhibitor.

Normally, when osmolality falls below its set point, plasma vasopressin levels become undetectable, and an aquaresis results. In SIADH, vasopressin release is not fully suppressed, despite hypotonicity. In cirrhosis and CHF, impaired delivery of solute to the diluting sites or diminished glomerular filtration rate causes impairment of maximal water-excretory capacity, resulting in persistence of vasopressin release leading to water retention.

Vasopressin receptor antagonists include the new class of "vaptan drugs" such as conivaptan, tolvaptan, mozavaptan, lixivaptan, satavaptan etc.
