= PF-06655075 =

Clinical data
- Other names: PF06655075; PF-6655075; PF6655075
- Drug class: Oxytocin receptor agonist; Vasopressin V_{1A} receptor antagonist; Vasopressin V_{2} receptor agonist
- ATC code: None

Identifiers
- IUPAC name: (4R,7S,10S,13S,16S,19R)-19-amino-7-(2-amino-2-oxoethyl)-N-[2-[[(2S)-1-[(2-amino-2-oxoethyl)amino]-6-[3-[2-[2-[2-[2-[2-[2-[2-[2-(hexadecanoylamino)ethoxy]ethoxy]ethoxy]ethoxy]ethoxy]ethoxy]ethoxy]ethoxy]propanoylamino]-1-oxohexan-2-yl]amino]-2-oxoethyl]-10-(3-amino-3-oxopropyl)-13-[(2S)-butan-2-yl]-16-[(4-hydroxyphenyl)methyl]-6,9,12,15,18-pentaoxo-1,2-dithia-5,8,11,14,17-pentazacycloicosane-4-carboxamide
- PubChem CID: 155562905
- ChemSpider: 129469645
- ChEMBL: ChEMBL4571665

Chemical and physical data
- Formula: C_{75}H_{130}N_{14}O_{22}S_{2}
- Molar mass: 1644.06 g·mol^{−1}
- 3D model (JSmol): Interactive image
- SMILES: CCCCCCCCCCCCCCCC(=O)NCCOCCOCCOCCOCCOCCOCCOCCOCCC(=O)NCCCC[C@@H](C(=O)NCC(=O)N)NC(=O)CNC(=O)[C@@H]1CSSC[C@@H](C(=O)N[C@H](C(=O)N[C@H](C(=O)N[C@H](C(=O)N[C@H](C(=O)N1)CC(=O)N)CCC(=O)N)[C@@H](C)CC)CC2=CC=C(C=C2)O)N
- InChI: InChI=1S/C75H130N14O22S2/c1-4-6-7-8-9-10-11-12-13-14-15-16-17-21-65(94)81-30-32-105-34-36-107-38-40-109-42-44-111-46-45-110-43-41-108-39-37-106-35-33-104-31-28-66(95)80-29-19-18-20-57(70(98)82-49-64(79)93)84-67(96)50-83-71(99)61-52-113-112-51-56(76)69(97)86-59(47-54-22-24-55(90)25-23-54)74(102)89-68(53(3)5-2)75(103)85-58(26-27-62(77)91)72(100)87-60(48-63(78)92)73(101)88-61/h22-25,53,56-61,68,90H,4-21,26-52,76H2,1-3H3,(H2,77,91)(H2,78,92)(H2,79,93)(H,80,95)(H,81,94)(H,82,98)(H,83,99)(H,84,96)(H,85,103)(H,86,97)(H,87,100)(H,88,101)(H,89,102)/t53-,56-,57-,58-,59-,60-,61-,68-/m0/s1; Key:NRZDYVUJLXPBEW-PIFLIQEJSA-N

PF-06655075, also known as PF1 or as ASK1476, is a peripherally selective long-acting peptide oxytocin receptor agonist which is used in scientific research. It is a lipidated analogue of oxytocin with dramatically enhanced metabolic stability and increased oxytocin receptor selectivity.

PF-06655075 is a highly potent near-full agonist of the oxytocin receptor with similar affinity and potency as oxytocin itself (K_{i} = 0.037 nM; EC_{50} = 0.025 nM; E_{max} = 90%) and to a much lesser extent is an antagonist of the vasopressin V_{1A} receptor (K_{i} = 4.37 nM; EC_{50} = >1,000 nM). It is also a potent agonist of the vasopressin V_{2} receptor (EC_{50} = 0.36 nM), with about 14-fold lower activational potency than at the oxytocin receptor. The drug has been found to inhibit conditioned fear-induced freezing behavior and anxiety in rodents when given either centrally or peripherally. It has been found to decrease alcohol consumption when given centrally but not peripherally in rodents. In addition, PF-06655075 robustly reduced food intake and body weight when given peripherally in rodents similarly to oxytocin but with less frequent and more convenient administration.

Whereas oxytocin itself has an extremely short plasma elimination half-life, for instance 2 to 4 minutes in humans and 7 minutes in rats, PF-06655075 showed had a half-life of 8.5 hours by intravenous injection in rats. Non-depot subcutaneous injection resulted in an oxytocin half-life of 0.5 hours and a PF-06655075 half-life of 3.2 hours, whereas depot subcutaneous injection gave an oxytocin half-life of 7.3 hours and a PF-06655075 half-life of 309 hours. Both oxytocin and PF-06655075 are highly peripherally selective, with oxytocin showing a brain-to-plasma ratio of approximately 1% and PF-06655075 showing a ratio of about 2%. Unlike oxytocin, which is not highly bound to plasma proteins, PF-06655075 shows high plasma protein binding, and this is involved in its resistance to metabolism and longer duration.

The chemical synthesis of PF-06655075 has been described. An analogue of PF-06655075, PF-06478939 (PF2), has also been described.

PF-06655075 was developed by Pfizer for use as a tool in scientific research and was first described in the scientific literature by 2016.

== See also ==
- Oxytocin receptor agonist
- OT-12
