= Vasopressin receptor antagonist =

Agent that interferes with action at the vasopressin receptors

A vasopressin receptor antagonist (VRA) is an agent that interferes with action at the vasopressin receptors. Most commonly VRAs are used in the treatment of hyponatremia, especially in patients with congestive heart failure, liver cirrhosis or SIADH.

== Types ==
=== Vaptans ===
The "vaptan" drugs act by directly blocking the action of vasopressin at its receptors (V_{1A}, V_{1B} and V_{2}). These receptors have a variety of functions, with the V_{1A} and V_{2} receptors are expressed peripherally and involved in the modulation of blood pressure and kidney function respectively, while the V_{1A} and V_{1B} receptors are expressed in the central nervous system. V_{1A} is expressed in many regions of the brain, and has been linked to a variety of social behaviors in humans and animals.

The vaptan class of drugs contains a number of compounds with varying selectivity, several of which are either already in clinical use or in clinical trials as of 2009.

Unselective (mixed V_{1A}/V_{2})

- Conivaptan

V_{1A} selective (V_{1}RA)

- Relcovaptan

V_{1B} selective (V_{3}RA)

- Nelivaptan

V_{2} selective (V_{2}RA)

- Lixivaptan
- Mozavaptan
- Satavaptan
- Tolvaptan

=== Somatostatin ===
Somatostatin is a competitive inhibitor.

=== Demeclocycline and lithium ===
Demeclocycline, a tetracycline antibiotic, is sometimes used to block the action of vasopressin in the kidney in hyponatremia due to inappropriately high secretion of vasopressin (SIADH), when fluid restriction has failed. Demeclocycline is not a direct antagonist of the vasopressin receptors however, but rather inhibits activation of the intracellular second messenger cascade of this receptor in the kidney by an unknown mechanism.

Lithium, as lithium carbonate, possesses similar properties to those of demeclocycline on the action of vasopressin in the kidney, and was used clinically before demeclocycline, which largely superseded it for this indication.

== Medical use ==
=== Hyponatremia ===
V_{2}R antagonists have become a mainstay of treatment for euvolemic (i.e., SIADH, postoperative hyponatremia) and hypervolemic hyponatremia (i.e., CHF and cirrhosis). V_{2}RAs predictably cause aquaresis leading to increased [Na^{+}] in majority of patients with hyponatremia due to SIADH, CHF, and cirrhosis. The optimum use of VRAs has not yet been determined, but some predictions can be made with reasonable certainty. For hyponatremia in hospitalized patients, who are unable to take medication orally or for those in whom a more rapid correction of hyponatremia is desired, conivaptan (V_{1}/V_{2}R antagonist) will likely be the preferred agent. Selective V_{2}R antagonists such as tolvaptan or lixivaptan will likely be useful in patients for whom oral therapy is suitable and for more chronic forms of hyponatremia.

=== Congestive heart failure ===
Neurohormonal activation characteristic of CHF, including increased renin, angiotensin, aldosterone, and catecholamines, contributes to progression of CHF. It has been suggested that cardiovascular mortality may be reduced by selective V_{2}RA such as tolvaptan in the higher risk group with kidney function impairment or severe congestive findings. But until FDA indication is granted for use in CHF with or without accompanying hyponatremia, VRAs are not recommended in patients with CHF.

=== Cirrhosis ===
V_{2}RA may be particularly beneficial in the treatment of patients with advanced liver cirrhosis and ascites. Blockade of V_{2}R will induce an effective aquaresis and inhibition of V_{2}-mediated vasodilation. This aquaresis, in combination with a diuresis, may provide a potential therapy for patients with resistant ascites. V_{2} receptor antagonism increases plasma vasopressin concentration, which may cause unopposed hyperstimulation of the vasoconstrictor V_{1} receptor. Given the potential hyperstimulation of V_{1}R, V_{2}RA may have additional secondary preventative benefits in patients with cirrhosis through a reduction in portal pressure and a decreased risk of variceal bleeding.

=== Polycystic kidney disease ===
Polycystin defects increase intracellular cAMP, secondary messenger for vasopressin acting at V_{2}R, leading to cyst development. cAMP-dependent genes promote fluid secretion into developing renal cysts and increase cell proliferation. Studies in several animal models of polycystic kidney disease have shown a reduction in kidney size and cyst volume after treatment with specific V_{2} receptor antagonist. Full scale therapeutic trials of V_{2}RAs in patients with autosomal dominant polycystic kidney disease are currently ongoing.

=== Nephrogenic diabetes insipidus ===
Congenital nephrogenic diabetes insipidus (NDI) may result from V_{2}R or aquaporin-2 (AQP2) mutations. Exogenously administered V_{2}R antagonists can bind to misfolded intracellular V_{2}R, and improve transport of V_{2}R to the cell membrane. Clinical studies in patients with X-linked NDI showed that the selective V_{1}R antagonist relcovaptan (SR49059, Sanofi-Aventis) significantly increased urine osmolality and decreased 24-hour urine flow. Thus V_{1}R and/or V_{2}R antagonists may serve as molecular chaperones to mitigate misfolding defects in selected patients with type 2 NDI.
