= TC OT 39 =

Chemical compound

Clinical data
- Other names: "Compound 39"; SynOTA
- Drug class: Oxytocin receptor agonist; Vasopressin receptor modulator
- ATC code: None

Identifiers
- IUPAC name: (2S)-N-[[4-[(4,10-dihydro-1-methylpyrazolo[3,4-b][1,5]benzodiazepin-5(1H)-yl)carbonyl]-2-methylphenyl]methyl]-2-[(hexahydro-4-methyl-1H-1,4-diazepin-1-yl)thioxomethyl]-1-pyrrolidinecarboxamide
- CAS Number: 479232-57-0
- PubChem CID: 135413563
- ChemSpider: 23249746
- UNII: RMV6SD8REW
- CompTox Dashboard (EPA): DTXSID301031871

Chemical and physical data
- Formula: C_{32}H_{40}N_{8}O_{2}S
- Molar mass: 600.79 g·mol^{−1}
- 3D model (JSmol): Interactive image
- SMILES: Cc1cc(ccc1CNC(=O)N2CCC[C@H]2C(=S)N3CCCN(CC3)C)C(=O)N4Cc5cnn(c5Nc6c4cccc6)C
- InChI: InChI=1S/C32H40N8O2S/c1-22-18-23(30(41)40-21-25-20-34-37(3)29(25)35-26-8-4-5-9-27(26)40)11-12-24(22)19-33-32(42)39-15-6-10-28(39)31(43)38-14-7-13-36(2)16-17-38/h4-5,8-9,11-12,18,20,28,35H,6-7,10,13-17,19,21H2,1-3H3,(H,33,42)/t28-/m0/s1; Key:KSNHHKZYKYNBEI-NDEPHWFRSA-N

TC OT 39, also known as "compound 39", is a non-peptide partial agonist of the oxytocin and vasopressin V_{2} receptors (K_{i} = 147 nM and >1,000 nM, respectively) and antagonist of the vasopressin V_{1A} receptor (K_{i} = 330 nM). The EC_{50} values of the drug were 33 nM at the oxytocin receptor and 850 nM at the vasopressin V_{2} receptor. TC OT 39 was first described in the scientific literature by Gary R. W. Pitt and colleagues in 2004. The drug was the first small-molecule oxytocin receptor agonist to be described, though it was the lead optimized compound of a described series of compounds. Subsequently, improved analogues like WAY-267,464 (2010), LIT-001 (2018), and LIT-002 (2026) were described.

== See also ==
- Oxytocin receptor agonist
- WAY-267,464
- LIT-001
- LIT-002
- KNX-100
