= Lixivaptan =

Chemical compound

Clinical data
- Other names: VPA-985
- ATC code: none

Identifiers
- IUPAC name: N-[3-chloro-4-(6,11-dihydropyrrolo[2,1-c] [1,4]benzodiazepine-5-carbonyl)phenyl]-5-fluoro-2-methylbenzamide
- CAS Number: 168079-32-1
- PubChem CID: 172997
- IUPHAR/BPS: 2238
- ChemSpider: 151067
- UNII: 8F5X4B082E
- ChEMBL: ChEMBL49429
- CompTox Dashboard (EPA): DTXSID00168472
- ECHA InfoCard: 100.126.016

Chemical and physical data
- Formula: C_{27}H_{21}ClFN_{3}O_{2}
- Molar mass: 473.93 g·mol^{−1}
- 3D model (JSmol): Interactive image
- SMILES: C1c2cccn2Cc3ccccc3N1C(=O)c4ccc(cc4Cl)NC(=O)c5cc(F)ccc5C
- InChI: InChI=1S/C27H21ClFN3O2/c1-17-8-9-19(29)13-23(17)26(33)30-20-10-11-22(24(28)14-20)27(34)32-16-21-6-4-12-31(21)15-18-5-2-3-7-25(18)32/h2-14H,15-16H2,1H3,(H,30,33); Key:PPHTXRNHTVLQED-UHFFFAOYSA-N

Lixivaptan (VPA-985) is an orally-active, non-peptide, selective vasopressin V_{2} receptor antagonist being developed as an investigational drug by Palladio Biosciences, Inc. (Palladio), a subsidiary of Centessa Pharmaceuticals plc. As of December 2021, lixivaptan is in phase III clinical development for the treatment of autosomal dominant polycystic kidney disease (ADPKD), the most common form of polycystic kidney disease. The U.S. Food and Drug Administration (FDA) has granted orphan drug designation to lixivaptan for the treatment of ADPKD.

== Mechanism of action ==
Lixivaptan is a potent, non-peptide, selective vasopressin receptor antagonist. It is a member of the vaptan class of drugs.

=== Hyponatremia ===
V_{2} receptor antagonists inhibit the binding of arginine vasopressin to vasopressin receptor 2 (V_{2}R) in kidney tubular epithelial cells, thereby having a net effect of aquaresis, or electrolyte free water excretion. This property of vaptans explains their use as therapies to treat euvolemic and hypervolemic hyponatremia.

=== ADPKD ===
V_{2} receptor antagonists may have utility as therapies for ADPKD. Genetic mutations associated with ADPKD cause an increase in intracellular levels of cyclic adenosine monophosphate (cAMP), which results in increased cellular proliferation and cyst formation and expansion in the kidney. Cyst growth displaces and destroys normal kidney tissue, leading to a decreased number and function of nephrons. Because intracellular cAMP is a secondary messenger for vasopressin acting at V_{2}R (vasopressin receptor 2), V_{2} receptor antagonists can restore normal levels of intracellular cAMP, thereby delaying cyst growth. Treatment with specific V_{2} receptor antagonists have shown a reduction in kidney size and cyst volume in animal models of PKD. In particular, lixivaptan has demonstrated beneficial effects on cystic disease progression in rat and mouse models of ADPKD.

== Research ==
=== V_{2} receptor antagonists in ADPKD ===
Proof of efficacy for V_{2} receptor antagonists to treat ADPKD has been demonstrated by clinical trials with tolvaptan, a vasopressin antagonist in the same drug class as lixivaptan. In clinical studies, tolvaptan showed a significant decrease in the rate of disease progression in patients with ADPKD, which led to regulatory approvals for tolvaptan as a treatment of ADPKD in many countries, including the U.S., the EU, Japan, Canada, Australia, and Korea, among others. However, tolvaptan therapy is associated with potentially life-threatening liver toxicity in patients with ADPKD. Because of the risk of liver toxicity, in the US, tolvaptan is only available for ADPKD under a restricted distribution program (a Risk Evaluation and Mitigation Strategies (REMS program). The FDA-approved prescribing information for tolvaptan for ADPKD includes a boxed warning for the risk of serious liver toxicity.

=== Clinical studies ===
==== Hyponatremia ====
Lixivaptan was previously administered to more than 1600 subjects across 36 clinical studies as part of a prior clinical development program for the treatment of hyponatremia sponsored by Cardiokine, Inc. Across these studies, lixivaptan showed prolonged inhibition of the vasopressin V2 receptor, as measured by changes in pharmacodynamic markers such as urine osmolality, plasma copeptin, and estimated glomerular filtration rate (eGFR). Development of lixivaptan for hyponatremia indications is no longer ongoing.

==== ADPKD ====
Palladio conducted the ELiSA Phase II study with lixivaptan in 31 ADPKD patients. In this study, the proportion of study subjects who showed a urine osmolality response consistent with full vasopressin V_{2} receptor inhibition was qualitatively and quantitatively similar to the published effect seen in clinical studies conducted with tolvaptan.

A Phase III study by Palladio to investigate whether it is safe and effective for the treatment of ADPKD was commenced in October 2021. The Phase III program with lixivaptan consists of two ongoing clinical trials: the ACTION and ALERT studies.

==== The ACTION study ====
The ACTION study is a pivotal registration-enabling Phase III clinical trial of lixivaptan in patients with ADPKD. It is projected to enroll 1350 patients in more than 20 countries worldwide. If the ACTION study is successful, it will provide the main clinical evidence supporting the potential safety and efficacy of lixivaptan for the treatment of ADPKD.

The ACTION trial consists of two main parts. In Part 1 of the study, after completing the screening, run-in and titration periods, study subjects will enter a two-arm, double-blind, placebo-controlled, randomized period during which they will receive lixivaptan or placebo for 12 months. This part of the trial will compare the change in estimated glomerular filtration rate (eGFR) measurements between the two groups to investigate the efficacy of lixivaptan in slowing the decline in kidney function. This is followed by Part 2 of the study, during which all study participants who complete Part 1 will receive lixivaptan in a single-arm, open-label phase for an additional 12 months. Part 2 will investigate whether lixivaptan's effect on kidney function continues to accrue over time. Altogether, including the titration periods, participants in the ACTION study will be taking study drug for more than two years, including lixivaptan for at least one year. It is expected that Part 1 will be completed for all participants by February 2025; Part 2 is projected to run until April 2026.

==== The ALERT study ====
The second Phase III study with lixivaptan is the ALERT study. The goal of this study is to investigate whether lixivaptan can be safely used in patients with ADPKD who were previously treated with tolvaptan, but who had to permanently discontinue tolvaptan therapy due to liver toxicity. In the study, following titration to an optimal dose, up to 50 patients with ADPKD will be enrolled and treated with lixivaptan for 52 weeks. They will be monitored frequently for signs of liver toxicity for as long as they are taking lixivaptan. At the completion of the 52 weeks maintenance period, patients will be eligible to continue to receive lixivaptan in an open label extension study.

=== DILIsym simulations ===
Tolvaptan was studied in DILIsym, a computational model that uses non-clinical and clinical drug data to predict whether a drug could cause idiosyncratic liver toxicity. DILIsym® replicated accurately the liver toxicity observed with tolvaptan in clinical studies. Conversely, results from the DILIsym® study with lixivaptan suggest that lixivaptan may be less likely to cause idiosyncratic liver toxicity within this modeling system. Whether this result reliably predicts a lower risk of liver injury for lixivaptan will require more clinical safety data, which will be collected as part of the two ongoing Phase III clinical studies.
