= OT-12 =

Clinical data
- Other names: OT-12; OT12
- Routes of administration: Subcutaneous injection
- Drug class: Oxytocin receptor agonist
- ATC code: None

Identifiers
- IUPAC name: 18-[[(1S)-5-[3-[2-[2-[3-[2-[2-[[2-[(2R)-3-[(2-amino-2-oxoethyl)amino]-2-[[(2S)-1-[(3R,6S,9S,12S,15S)-6-(2-amino-2-oxoethyl)-9-(3-amino-3-oxopropyl)-12-[(2R)-butan-2-yl]-15-[(4-hydroxyphenyl)methyl]-5,8,11,14,17-pentaoxo-1-thia-4,7,10,13,16-pentazacyclohenicosane-3-carbonyl]pyrrolidine-2-carbonyl]amino]-3-oxopropyl]sulfanylacetyl]amino]ethoxy]ethoxy]propanoylamino]ethoxy]ethoxy]propanoylamino]-1-carboxypentyl]amino]-18-oxooctadecanoic acid
- PubChem CID: 172966246

Chemical and physical data
- Formula: C_{82}H_{135}N_{15}O_{24}S_{2}
- Molar mass: 1779.18 g·mol^{−1}
- 3D model (JSmol): Interactive image
- SMILES: CC[C@@H](C)[C@H]1C(=O)N[C@H](C(=O)N[C@H](C(=O)N[C@@H](CSCCCCC(=O)N[C@H](C(=O)N1)CC2=CC=C(C=C2)O)C(=O)N3CCC[C@H]3C(=O)N[C@@H](CSCC(=O)NCCOCCOCCC(=O)NCCOCCOCCC(=O)NCCCC[C@@H](C(=O)O)NC(=O)CCCCCCCCCCCCCCCCC(=O)O)C(=O)NCC(=O)N)CC(=O)N)CCC(=O)N
- InChI: InChI=1S/C82H135N15O24S2/c1-3-55(2)74-80(114)92-58(32-33-65(83)99)76(110)93-61(50-66(84)100)77(111)95-63(53-122-48-21-19-26-71(105)91-60(78(112)96-74)49-56-28-30-57(98)31-29-56)81(115)97-39-22-24-64(97)79(113)94-62(75(109)89-51-67(85)101)52-123-54-72(106)88-38-43-121-47-45-119-41-35-69(103)87-37-42-120-46-44-118-40-34-68(102)86-36-20-18-23-59(82(116)117)90-70(104)25-16-14-12-10-8-6-4-5-7-9-11-13-15-17-27-73(107)108/h28-31,55,58-64,74,98H,3-27,32-54H2,1-2H3,(H2,83,99)(H2,84,100)(H2,85,101)(H,86,102)(H,87,103)(H,88,106)(H,89,109)(H,90,104)(H,91,105)(H,92,114)(H,93,110)(H,94,113)(H,95,111)(H,96,112)(H,107,108)(H,116,117)/t55-,58+,59+,60+,61+,62+,63+,64+,74+/m1/s1; Key:XYTFBZFZYWSYGY-BAROQLTRSA-N

OT-12 is a long-acting peripherally selective peptide oxytocin receptor agonist. It is a potent full agonist of the oxytocin receptor with comparable potency to oxytocin but with greater selectivity for the oxytocin receptor over the vasopressin receptors relative to oxytocin. The drug is highly peripherally selective similarly to oxytocin, with a brain-to-plasma ratio of about 1/190 or 0.5%. However, it shows much greater plasma protein binding and consequent metabolic stability compared to oxytocin. Whereas oxytocin has a plasma half-life of 2 to 3 minutes, OT-12 shows a terminal half-life with depot subcutaneous injection of 24 hours in rodents. It is thought that in humans the half-life of OT-12 by this route would be further much longer and could potentially allow for administration once every 1 to 2 weeks. Despite not crossing into the brain, OT-12 has been found to suppress food intake and decrease body weight when given by subcutaneous injection in rodents. The chemical synthesis of OT-12 has been described. OT-12 was first described in the scientific literature by Elsa Pflimlin and colleagues by 2020.

== See also ==
- Oxytocin receptor agonist
- PF-06655075 (PF1; ASK1476)
