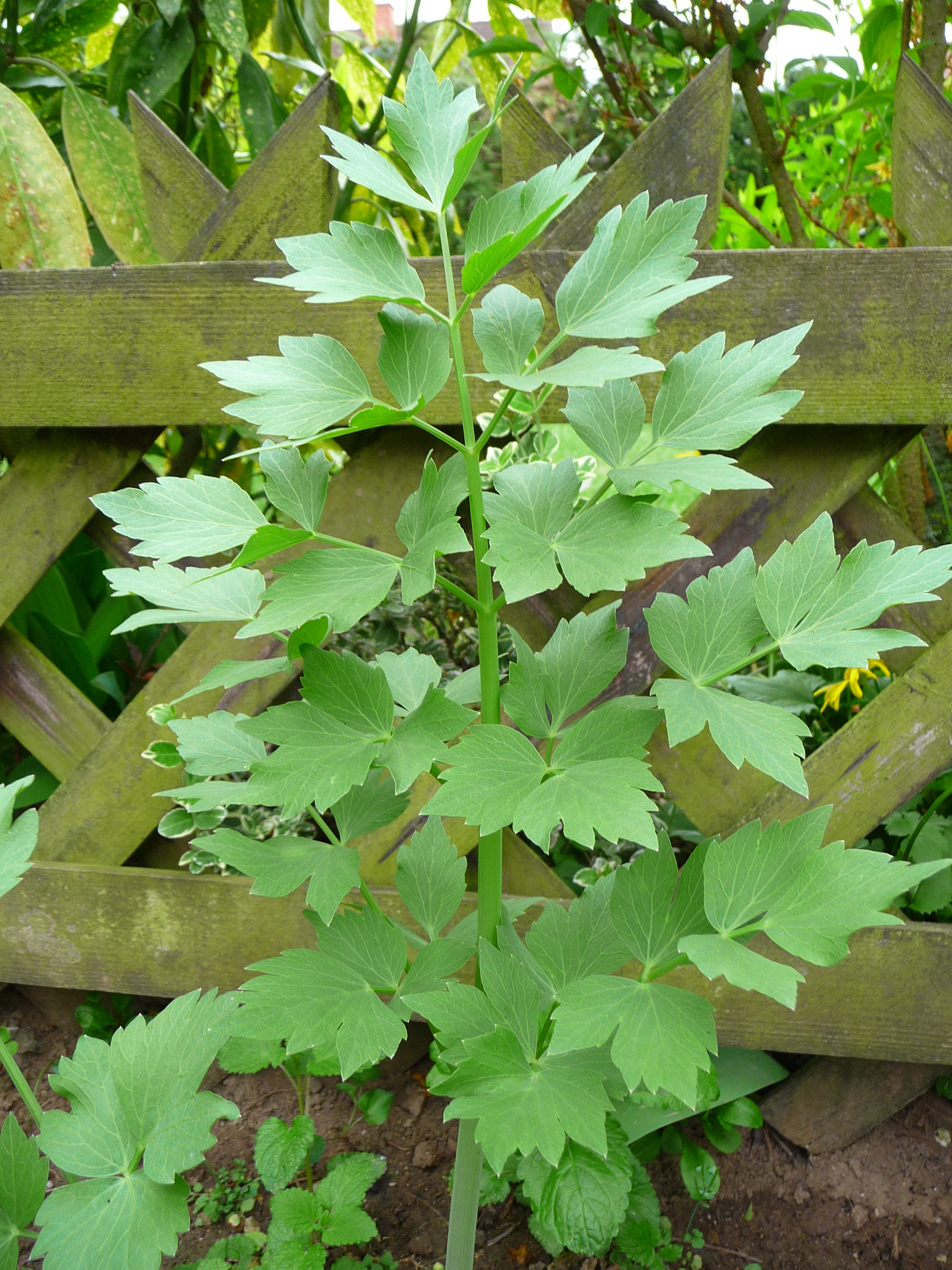

Scientific classification
- Kingdom: Plantae
- Clade: Embryophytes
- Clade: Tracheophytes
- Clade: Spermatophytes
- Clade: Angiosperms
- Clade: Eudicots
- Clade: Asterids
- Order: Apiales
- Family: Apiaceae
- Subfamily: Apioideae
- Genus: Levisticum; Hill
- Species: L. officinale

Binomial name
- Levisticum officinale W.D.J.Koch

Synonyms
- Angelica levisticum (L.) All.; Hipposelinum levisticum (L.) Britton; Ligusticum levisticum L.; Selinum levisticum (L.) E.H.L.Krause; Angelica paludapifolia Lam.; Levisticum caucasicum Lipsky; Levisticum levisticum H.Karst.; Levisticum paludapifolium Asch.; Levisticum persicum Freyn & Bornm.; Levisticum vulgare Hill; Levisticum vulgare Rchb.

= Lovage =

Species of flowering plant

Lovage (/ˈlʌvɪdʒ/ LUV-ij; Levisticum officinale) is a perennial plant, the sole species in the genus Levisticum in the family Apiaceae, subfamily Apioideae. It is native to Afghanistan and Iran.

It has been long cultivated in Europe and the leaves are used as a herb, the roots as a vegetable, and the seeds as a spice, especially in southern European cuisine. Its flavour and smell are reminiscent both of celery and parsley, only more intense and spicier than either. The seeds can be used in the same way as fennel seeds.

== Description ==
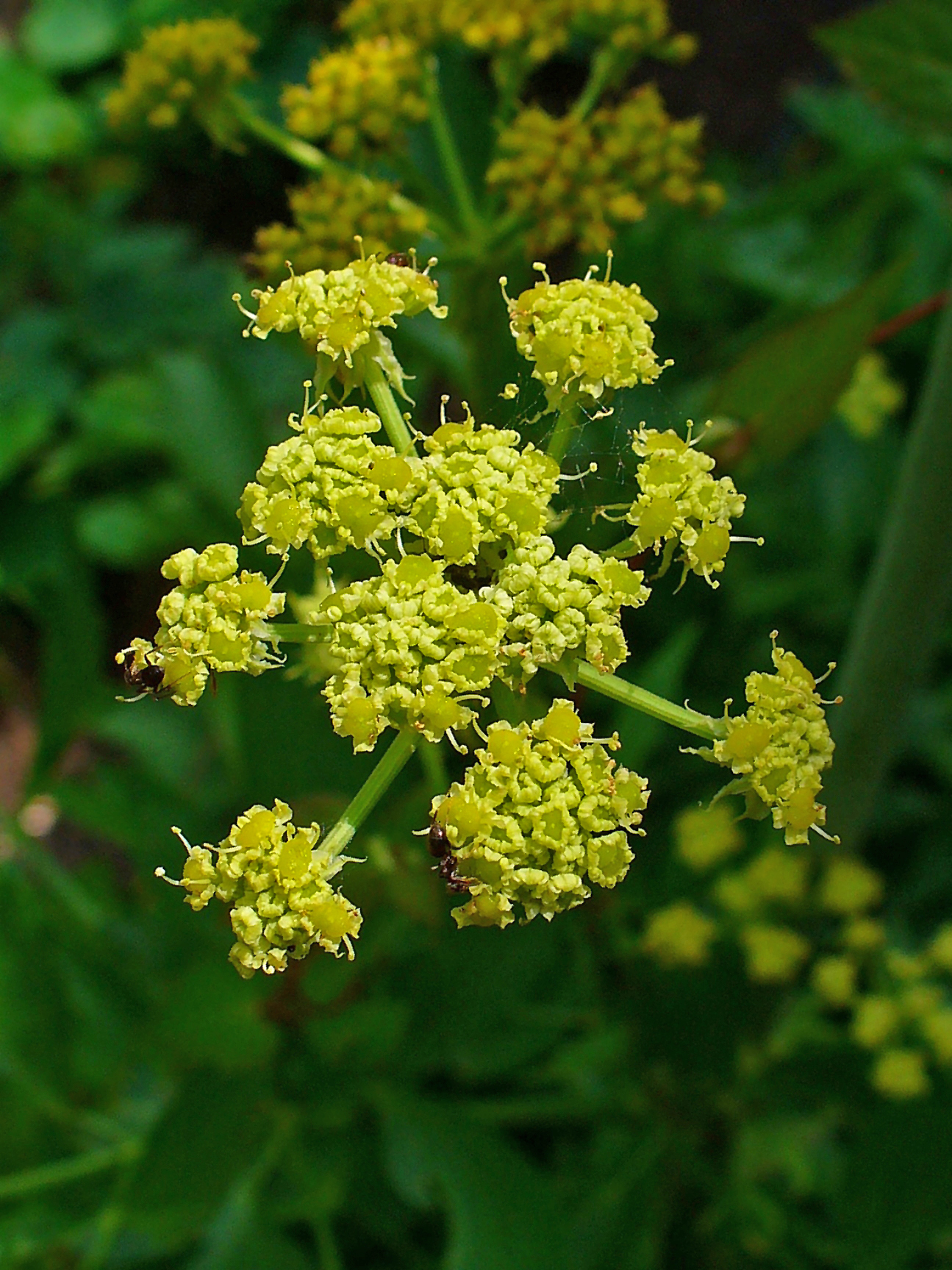
Lovage flowers

Lovage is an erect, herbaceous, perennial plant growing to 2.5 metres (8 ft) tall, with a basal rosette of leaves and leaved stems. The stems and leaves are shiny glabrous green to yellow-green and smell somewhat similar to celery when crushed. The leaflets have a few large triangular to rhomboidal teeth. The larger basal leaves are up to 70 centimetres (28 in) long and trifoliate, while the stem leaves are smaller and less divided, with few leaflets.

Produced in umbels at the top of the stems, the flowers are yellow to greenish-yellow, 2–3 mm (1/16–1/8 in) diameter, produced in globose umbels up to 10–15 cm (4–6 in) diameter; flowering is in late spring. The fruit is a dry two-parted schizocarp 4–7 mm (3/16–1/4 in) long, maturing in autumn.

== Taxonomy ==
Carl Linnaeus used the basionym Ligusticum levisticum in Species Plantarum to refer to lovage. Levisticum officinale was later described by Wilhelm Daniel Joseph Koch and published in 1824.

=== Etymology ===
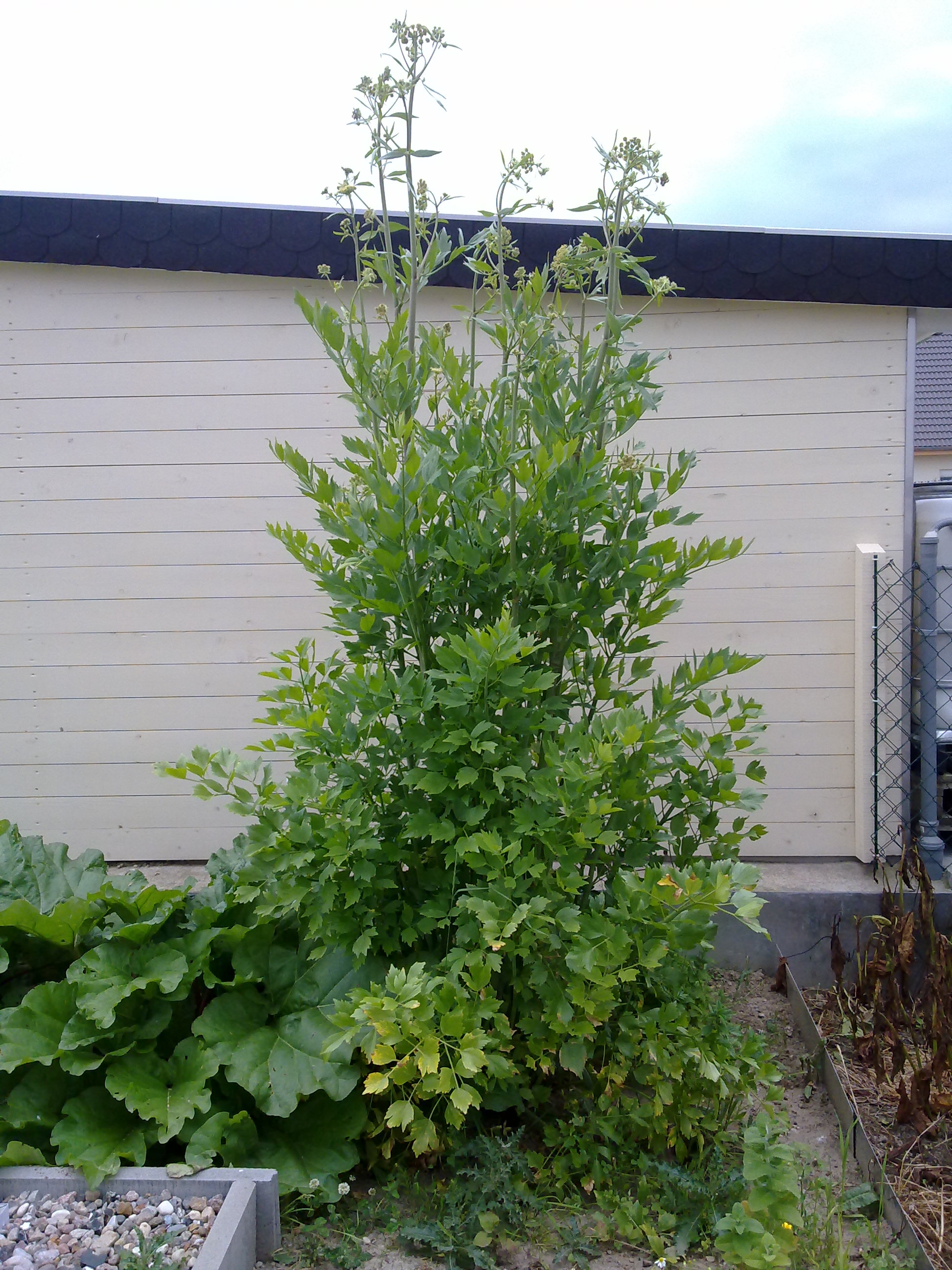
A lovage plant in Germany beginning to bloom in June, 2.78 m (9 ft 1 in) tall

The name lovage is from love-ache, ache being a medieval name for parsley; this is a folk-etymological modification of the older French name levesche, from late Latin levisticum, in turn thought to be a modification of the earlier Latin ligusticum, 'of Liguria' (northwest Italy), where the herb was grown extensively. In modern botanical usage, both Latin forms are now used for different (but closely related) genera, with Levisticum for (culinary) lovage, and Ligusticum for Scots lovage, a similar species from northern Europe, and for related species.

== Distribution ==
Levisticum officinale is native to Afghanistan and Iran, but has been introduced to most of Europe, parts of Southeast Asia, and the Americas.

== Health concerns ==
Essential oil distilled from lovage root contains furanocoumarins which can lead to photosensitivity in sensitive individuals if ingested as a medicine, or applied to the skin; or if the plant is harvested and contact with the skin occurs.

== Uses ==
The leaves can be used in salads, or to make soup or season broths, and the roots can be eaten as a vegetable or grated for use in salads. Its flavour and smell are reminiscent both of celery and parsley, only more intense and spicy than either. The seeds can be used as a spice in the same way as fennel seeds.

The plant has long been cultivated in Europe, the leaves being used as a herb, the roots as a vegetable, and the seeds as a spice, especially in southern Europe.

- In the Netherlands, lovage leaves are traditionally cooked with white asparagus and salt and served with boiled eggs.
- In Ukraine, lovage (in Ukrainian: любисток, romanized: liubystok) is considered an aphrodisiac. Traditionally, an infusion prepared from lovage leaves has been used by women for rinsing their hair, in order to attract men with the pleasant spicy smell of the plant. Nowadays, hair conditioners can be bought which contain lovage extract to strengthen the hair. Lovage leaves and roots are also used in salads and as a spice in Ukraine.
- In Romania, the leaves are a preferred seasoning for the various local broths and are just as popular, in this respect, as parsley or dill. Furthermore, the dried foliage and seeds are added to pickled cabbage and cucumbers both to aid in their preservation and to add flavour to them.
- In the United Kingdom, an alcoholic lovage cordial is traditionally added to brandy as a winter drink and is or was popular in Cornwall where it was originally added to slightly spoiled smuggled brandy to hide the taste of salt.

The roots, which contain a heavy volatile oil, are used as a mild aquaretic.

== In culture ==
A recommendation to cultivate lovage on the agricultural properties of Charlemagne appears in chapter 70 of Capitulare de villis, a text written around 800 AD about the maintenance of royal estates.
