= Tolvaptan phosphate =

Drug for cardiac edema

Clinical data
- Trade names: Samtasu
- Other names: Tolvaptan sodium phosphate; OPC-61815

Identifiers
- IUPAC name: [(5R)-7-Chloro-1-[2-methyl-4-[(2-methylbenzoyl)amino]benzoyl]-2,3,4,5-tetrahydro-1-benzazepin-5-yl] dihydrogen phosphate
- CAS Number: 942619-74-1
- PubChem CID: 146035877
- ChemSpider: 17342600
- UNII: Y4P6WS9QVF
- KEGG: D11659

Chemical and physical data
- Formula: C_{26}H_{26}ClN_{2}O_{6}P
- Molar mass: 528.93 g·mol^{−1}
- 3D model (JSmol): Interactive image
- SMILES: CC1=CC=CC=C1C(=O)NC2=CC(=C(C=C2)C(=O)N3CCCC(C4=C3C=CC(=C4)Cl)OP(=O)(O)O)C
- InChI: InChI=1S/C26H26ClN2O6P/c1-16-6-3-4-7-20(16)25(30)28-19-10-11-21(17(2)14-19)26(31)29-13-5-8-24(35-36(32,33)34)22-15-18(27)9-12-23(22)29/h3-4,6-7,9-12,14-15,24H,5,8,13H2,1-2H3,(H,28,30)(H2,32,33,34)/t24-/m1/s1; Key:XTCFGVRVASPRTK-XMMPIXPASA-N

Tolvaptan phosphate is a drug used for the treatment of cardiac edema. It is a prodrug of tolvaptan, formulated as the salt tolvaptan sodium phosphate, for intravenous administration. Tolvaptan phosphate is converted into the active drug tolvaptan in the human body following administration.

It was developed by Otsuka Pharmaceutical Co. and was approved for use in Japan in 2022.
