= Relcovaptan =

Chemical compound

Clinical data
- Other names: (2S)-1-[(2R,3S)-5-chloro-3-(2-chlorophenyl)-1-(3,4-dimethoxyphenyl)sulfonyl-3-hydroxy-2H-indole-2-carbonyl]pyrrolidine-2-carboxamide
- ATC code: none

Identifiers
- IUPAC name: 1-({(2R,3S)-5-chloro-3-(2-chlorophenyl)-1-[(3,4-dimethoxyphenyl)sulfonyl]-3-hydroxy-2,3-dihydro-1H-indol-2-yl}carbonyl)-L-prolinamide
- CAS Number: 150375-75-0
- PubChem CID: 60943
- IUPHAR/BPS: 2200
- ChemSpider: 54910
- UNII: C1GL8G6G0O
- ChEMBL: ChEMBL419667
- CompTox Dashboard (EPA): DTXSID1045746

Chemical and physical data
- Formula: C_{28}H_{27}Cl_{2}N_{3}O_{7}S
- Molar mass: 620.50 g·mol^{−1}
- 3D model (JSmol): Interactive image
- SMILES: COC1=C(C=C(C=C1)S(=O)(=O)N2[C@H]([C@](C3=C2C=CC(=C3)Cl)(C4=CC=CC=C4Cl)O)C(=O)N5CCC[C@H]5C(=O)N)OC
- InChI: InChI=1S/C28H27Cl2N3O7S/c1-39-23-12-10-17(15-24(23)40-2)41(37,38)33-21-11-9-16(29)14-19(21)28(36,18-6-3-4-7-20(18)30)25(33)27(35)32-13-5-8-22(32)26(31)34/h3-4,6-7,9-12,14-15,22,25,36H,5,8,13H2,1-2H3,(H2,31,34)/t22-,25-,28+/m0/s1; Key:CEBYCSRFKCEUSW-NAYZPBBASA-N

Relcovaptan (SR-49059) is a non-peptide vasopressin receptor antagonist, selective for the V_{1A} subtype. It has shown positive initial results for the treatment of Raynaud syndrome and dysmenorrhoea, and as a tocolytic, although it is not yet approved for clinical use.
