= C1QTNF1 =

Protein-coding gene in the species Homo sapiens

Identifiers
- Aliases: C1QTNF1, CTRP1, GIP, ZSIG37, C1q and tumor necrosis factor related protein 1, C1q and TNF related 1
- External IDs: OMIM: 610365; MGI: 1919254; GeneCards: C1QTNF1

Gene location (Human)
Chr.	Chromosome 17 (human)
Band	17q25.3	Start	79,022,814 bp
Band	17q25.3	End	79,049,788 bp

Gene location (Mouse)
Chr.	Chromosome 11 (mouse)
Band	11|11 E2	Start	118,319,029 bp
Band	11|11 E2	End	118,340,789 bp
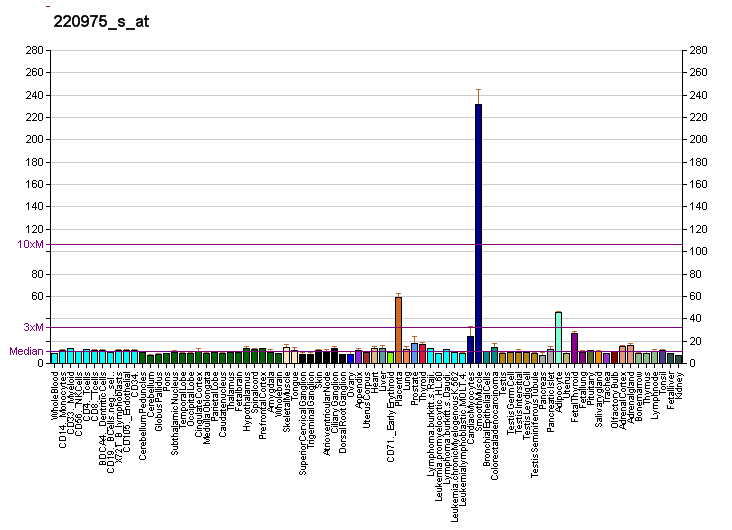
RNA expression pattern
Bgee	Human / Mouse (ortholog); Top expressed in: right coronary artery; popliteal artery; tibial arteries; left coronary artery; right auricle of heart; Descending thoracic aorta; ascending aorta; right lobe of thyroid gland; apex of heart; left lobe of thyroid gland / Top expressed in: decidua; gastrula; lumbar spinal ganglion; lip; esophagus; calvaria; ankle; ascending aorta; semi-lunar valve; aortic valve; More reference expression data
BioGPS	More reference expression data
Gene ontology
Molecular function	protein binding; collagen binding
Cellular component	extracellular region; collagen; integral component of plasma membrane; extracellular space
Biological process	positive regulation of cytosolic calcium ion concentration; negative regulation of platelet activation; protein heterotrimerization; regulation of glucose metabolic process; positive regulation of gene expression; positive regulation of protein kinase B signaling; positive regulation of aldosterone secretion; protein homooligomerization; negative regulation of platelet aggregation; positive regulation of MAPK cascade
Sources:Amigo / QuickGO
Orthologs
Databases	NCBI: entry; OMA: entry
Species	Human	Mouse
Entrez	114897	56745
Ensembl	ENSG00000173918	ENSMUSG00000017446
UniProt	Q9BXJ1	Q9QXP7
RefSeq (mRNA)	NM_030968; NM_153372; NM_198593; NM_198594	NM_001204129; NM_001204130; NM_019959
RefSeq (protein)	NP_112230; NP_699203; NP_940995; NP_940996	NP_001191058; NP_001191059; NP_064343
Location (UCSC)	Chr 17: 79.02 – 79.05 Mb	Chr 11: 118.32 – 118.34 Mb
PubMed search
- Wikidata
View/Edit Human	View/Edit Mouse

Complement C1q tumor necrosis factor-related protein 1 is a protein that in humans is encoded by the C1QTNF1 gene.

== Interactions ==
C1QTNF1 has been shown to interact with Arginine vasopressin receptor 2.
