= Phenypressin =

Names
- IUPAC name L-Cysteinyl-L-phenylalanyl-L-phenylalanyl-L-glutaminyl-L-asparagyl-L-cysteinyl-L-prolyl-L-arginyl-glycinamide (1→6)-disulfide
- Other names H-Cys(1)-Phe-Phe-Gln-Asn-Cys(1)-Pro-Arg-Gly-NH2; 2-Phe-argipressin

Identifiers
CAS Number	30635-27-9
3D model (JSmol)	Interactive image
ChEMBL	ChEMBL1819441
ChemSpider	26648048
PubChem CID	56658409
- InChI: InChI=1S/C46H65N15O11S2/c47-27-23-73-74-24-33(45(72)61-18-8-14-34(61)44(71)56-28(13-7-17-53-46(51)52)39(66)54-22-37(50)64)60-43(70)32(21-36(49)63)59-40(67)29(15-16-35(48)62)55-41(68)31(20-26-11-5-2-6-12-26)58-42(69)30(57-38(27)65)19-25-9-3-1-4-10-25/h1-6,9-12,27-34H,7-8,13-24,47H2,(H2,48,62)(H2,49,63)(H2,50,64)(H,54,66)(H,55,68)(H,56,71)(H,57,65)(H,58,69)(H,59,67)(H,60,70)(H4,51,52,53)/t27-,28-,29-,30-,31-,32-,33-,34-/m0/s1 Key: ANZXJGXSHMINOI-LGYYRGKSSA-N
- SMILES: C1C[C@H](N(C1)C(=O)[C@@H]2CSSC[C@@H](C(=O)N[C@H](C(=O)N[C@H](C(=O)N[C@H](C(=O)N[C@H](C(=O)N2)CC(=O)N)CCC(=O)N)CC3=CC=CC=C3)CC4=CC=CC=C4)N)C(=O)N[C@@H](CCCN=C(N)N)C(=O)NCC(=O)N

Properties
Chemical formula	C_{46}H_{65}N_{15}O_{11}S_{2}
Molar mass	1068.24 g·mol^{−1}
- Except where otherwise noted, data are given for materials in their standard state (at 25 °C [77 °F], 100 kPa). Infobox references

Phenypressin (Phe^{2}-Arg^{8}-vasopressin) is an oxytocin neuropeptide belonging to the vertebrae vasopressin family and has similar pharmacological properties as arginine vasopressin. The name phenypressin came about because there is a substitution of phenylalanine that makes it different from arginine vasopressin in the second residue and that is the only difference. It belongs to the family, neurohypophysial hormones, named after the fact that they are secreted by the neurohypophysis (i.e. posterior pituitary gland) which is a neural projection from the hypothalamus. It has mostly been found to be present is some species belonging to the family, Macropodidae, particularly eastern gray kangaroos^{[3]}, red kangaroos, tammar wallaby, and the quokka wallaby. In other marsupial families, Phenypressin has not yet specifically been identified, but they do have other vasopressin-like peptides present.

== Structure ==
Phenypressin was found to be less abundant in the marsupials compared to other vasopressin-like peptides. It belongs to some marsupials ^{[2]} and has the polypeptide sequence: Cys-Phe-Phe-Gln-Asn-Cys-Pro-Arg-Gly-NH2. The neurohypophyseal hormones present in Australian marsupials are unique compared to the usual hormones found in placental mammals: oxytocin and arginine vasopressin.

== Function ==
Phenypressin has very similar characteristics as arginine vasopressin, so it is synthesized in the hypothalamus and travels to the posterior pituitary and is then released into the vesicles. Since the functions are similar to arginine vasopressin, we can assume that Phenypressin also has two main functions. Mainly, it increases the reabsorption of water in the kidneys. Secondly, it can also cause vasoconstriction, increasing the blood pressure.

== Experimental history ==
This neurohypophysial hormone was identified and characterized by scientists through amino acid composition, ion-exchange chromatography, and high pressure liquid chromatography. Phenypressin differs from the common hormone, arginine vasopressin, because it has two phenylalanines and no tyrosine. A close look needs to be made in order to see the difference between arginine vasopressin and phenypressin because they have the same positions on the Amberlite CG-50 chromatograms and on paper chromato-electrophoresis. The differences in amino acids can be seen at residue 7. The phenypressin discovery happened with two experiments which were carried out for two species: red kangaroo (9 and 14 glands) and the tammer (24 and 33 glands). After experimental preparation, the materials were examined through paper chromato-electrophoresis. These experiments helped show that Phenypressin was similar to arginine vasopressin, except the phenylalanine replaced the tyrosine at the second residue.
