= Aquaretic =

Class of drugs

An aquaretic is a novel class of drug that is used to promote aquaresis, the excretion of water without electrolyte loss. Strictly speaking, aquaretics are not diuretics but are sometimes classified as such.

Aquaresis is preferable to diuresis in the treatment of hyponatremia.

== Pharmacokinetics ==
Aquaretics increase urine output without increasing sodium and chloride excretion, thus causing an increase in urine whilst retaining electrolytes.

== Examples ==
A number of herbal medicines are classified as aquaretics, for example common horsetail or common nettle leaves.

Synthetic aquaretics are vasopressin receptor antagonists and include conivaptan, tolvaptan, demeclocycline, and mozavaptan (OPC-31260), as well as lithium. Conivaptan hydrochloride and tolvaptan have been approved by the FDA for treating syndrome of inappropriate antidiuretic hormone. Mozavaptan is approved in Japan.
