= Vasopressin receptor 2 =

Protein-coding gene in the species Homo sapiens

AVPR2

Identifiers
- Aliases: AVPR2, ADHR, DI1, DIR, DIR3, NDI, V2R, arginine vasopressin receptor 2, NDI1
- External IDs: OMIM: 300538; MGI: 88123; GeneCards: AVPR2
Available structures
PDB	Ortholog search: PDBe RCSB
PDB	List of PDB id codes 4JQI

Gene location (Human)
Chr.	X chromosome (human)
Band	Xq28	Start	153,902,531 bp
Band	Xq28	End	153,907,166 bp

Gene location (Mouse)
Chr.	X chromosome (mouse)
Band	X A7.3|X 37.46 cM	Start	72,935,708 bp
Band	X A7.3|X 37.46 cM	End	72,939,108 bp
RNA expression pattern
Bgee	Human / Mouse (ortholog); Top expressed in: apex of heart; subcutaneous adipose tissue; left ventricle; granulocyte; vena cava; human kidney; muscle of thigh; left uterine tube; gastrocnemius muscle; right auricle of heart / Top expressed in: right kidney; granulocyte; human kidney; medullary collecting duct; embryo; choroid plexus of fourth ventricle; Ileal epithelium; CA3 field; thymus; primary motor cortex; More reference expression data
BioGPS	n/a
Gene ontology
Molecular function	G protein-coupled receptor activity; peptide binding; signal transducer activity; protein binding; vasopressin receptor activity
Cellular component	integral component of membrane; endosome; Golgi apparatus; membrane; plasma membrane; integral component of plasma membrane; endoplasmic reticulum; clathrin-coated vesicle membrane
Biological process	hemostasis; excretion; adenylate cyclase-modulating G protein-coupled receptor signaling pathway; regulation of systemic arterial blood pressure by vasopressin; activation of adenylate cyclase activity; response to peptide; cellular response to hormone stimulus; positive regulation of vasoconstriction; renal water homeostasis; positive regulation of protein ubiquitination; signal transduction; membrane organization; G protein-coupled receptor signaling pathway; positive regulation of gene expression; positive regulation of systemic arterial blood pressure; I-kappaB kinase/NF-kappaB signaling; positive regulation of cell population proliferation; telencephalon development; response to cytokine; negative regulation of urine volume; negative regulation of renal sodium excretion; positive regulation of blood pressure
Sources:Amigo / QuickGO
Orthologs
Databases	NCBI: entry; OMA: entry
Species	Human	Mouse
Entrez	554	12000
Ensembl	ENSG00000126895	ENSMUSG00000031390
UniProt	P30518	O88721
RefSeq (mRNA)	NM_000054; NM_001146151	NM_001276298; NM_001276299; NM_019404
RefSeq (protein)	NP_000045; NP_001139623	NP_001263227; NP_001263228; NP_062277
Location (UCSC)	Chr X: 153.9 – 153.91 Mb	Chr X: 72.94 – 72.94 Mb
PubMed search
- Wikidata
View/Edit Human	View/Edit Mouse

Vasopressin receptor 2 (V2R), or arginine vasopressin receptor 2 (officially called AVPR2), is a protein that acts as receptor for vasopressin. AVPR2 belongs to the subfamily of G-protein-coupled receptors. Its activity is mediated by the G_{s} type of G proteins, which stimulate adenylate cyclase.

AVPR2 is expressed in the kidney tubule, predominantly in the membrane of cells of the distal convoluted tubule and collecting ducts, in fetal lung tissue and lung cancer, the last two being associated with alternative splicing. AVPR2 is also expressed outside the kidney in vascular endothelium. Stimulation causes the release of von Willebrand factor and factor VIII from the endothelial cells. Because von Willebrand factor helps stabilize circulating levels of factor VIII, the vasopressin analog desmopressin can be used to stimulate the AVPR2 receptor and increase levels of circulating factor VIII. This is useful in the treatment of hemophilia A as well as Von Willebrand disease.

In the kidney, AVPR2's primary property is to respond to arginine vasopressin by stimulating mechanisms that concentrate the urine and maintain water homeostasis in the organism. When the function of AVPR2 is lost, the disease nephrogenic diabetes insipidus (NDI) results.

== Ligands ==
=== Agonists ===
- Desmopressin
- LIT-001
- LIT-002
- TC OT 39
- Vasopressin

=== Antagonists ===
Vasopressin receptor antagonists that are selective for the V2 receptor include:

- Tolvaptan (FDA-approved)
- Lixivaptan
- Mozavaptan
- Satavaptan

Their main uses are in hyponatremia, such as that caused by syndrome of inappropriate antidiuretic hormone (SIADH) and heart failure, however these agents should be avoided in patients with cirrhosis.

Demeclocycline and lithium carbonate act as indirect antagonists of renal vasopressin V_{2} receptors by inhibiting activation of the second messenger cascade of the receptors.

== Pharmacoperones ==
Vasopressin receptor 2 function has been shown to be deleteriously effected by point mutations in its gene. Some of these mutations, when expressed, cause the receptor to remain in the cytosol. An approach to rescue receptor function utilizes pharmacoperones or molecular chaperones, which are typically small molecules that rescue misfolded proteins to the cell surface. These interact with the receptor to restore cognate receptor function devoid of antagonist or agonist activity. This approach, when effective, should increase therapeutic reach. Pharmacoperones have been identified that restore function of V2R.

== Interactions ==
Arginine vasopressin receptor 2 has been shown to interact with C1QTNF1.
