= Vasopressin =

Mammalian hormone released from the pituitary gland

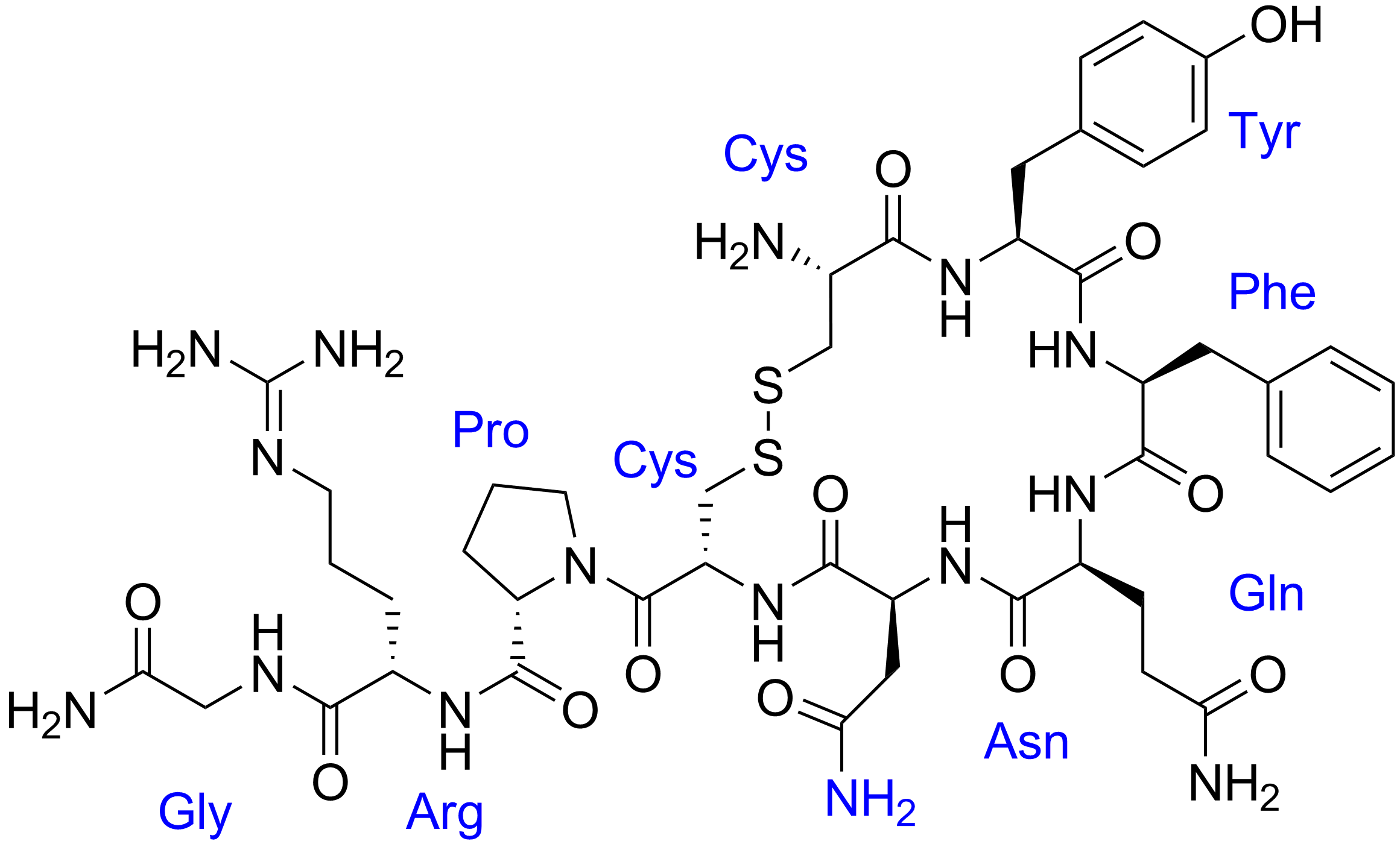

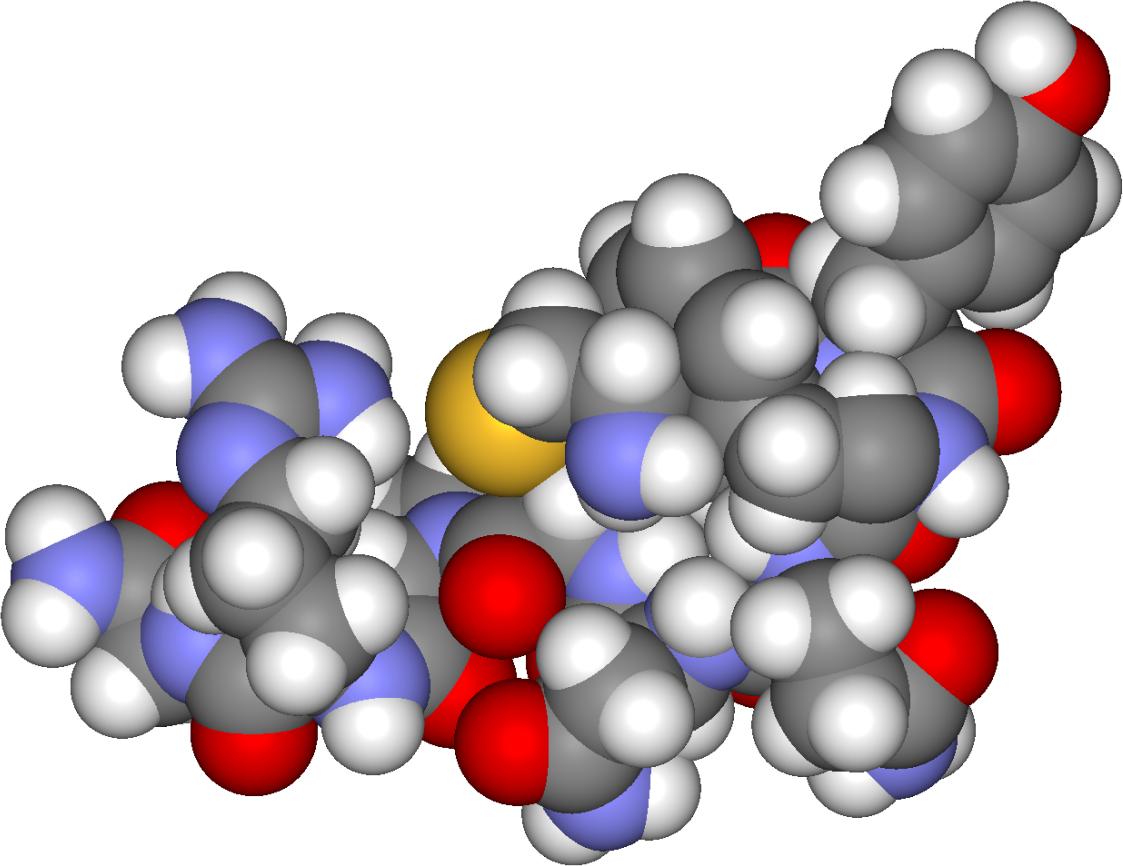

Clinical data
- Pronunciation: /ˌveɪzoʊˈprɛsɪn/
- Other names: Antidiuretic hormone (ADH); arginine vasopressin (AVP); argipressin
- ATC code: H01BA01 (WHO)

Physiological data
- Source tissues: Supraoptic nucleus; paraventricular nucleus of hypothalamus
- Target tissues: System-wide
- Receptors: V_{1A}, V_{1B}, V_{2}, OXTR
- Agonists: Felypressin, desmopressin
- Antagonists: Diuretics
- Metabolism: Predominantly in the liver and kidneys

Pharmacokinetic data
- Protein binding: 1%
- Metabolism: Predominantly in the liver and kidneys
- Elimination half-life: 10–20 minutes
- Excretion: Urine

Identifiers
- IUPAC name: 1-{[(4R,7S,10S,13S,16S,19R)-19-Amino-7-(2-amino-2-oxoethyl)-10-(3-amino-3-oxopropyl)-13-benzyl-16-(4-hydroxybenzyl)-6,9,12,15,18-pentaoxo-1,2-dithia-5,8,11,14,17-pentaazacycloicosan-4-yl]carbonyl}-L-p rolyl-L-arginylglycinamide
- CAS Number: 11000-17-2
- PubChem CID: 644077
- IUPHAR/BPS: 2168
- DrugBank: DB00067
- ChemSpider: 559126
- UNII: Y87Y826H08
- KEGG: D00101
- ChEBI: CHEBI:9937
- ChEMBL: ChEMBL373742
- CompTox Dashboard (EPA): DTXSID0048349

Chemical and physical data
- Formula: C_{46}H_{65}N_{15}O_{12}S_{2}
- Molar mass: 1084.24 g·mol^{−1}
- 3D model (JSmol): Interactive image
- Density: 1.6±0.1 g/cm^{3}
- SMILES: c1ccc(cc1)C[C@H]2C(=O)N[C@H](C(=O)N[C@H](C(=O)N[C@@H](CSSC[C@@H](C(=O)N[C@H](C(=O)N2)Cc3ccc(cc3)O)N)C(=O)N4CCC[C@H]4C(=O)N[C@@H](CCCN=C(N)N)C(=O)NCC(=O)N)CC(=O)N)CCC(=O)N
- InChI: InChI=1S/C46H65N15O12S2 /c47-27-22-74-75-23-33(45(73)61-17-5-9-34(61)44(72)56-28(8-4-16-53-46(51)52)39(67)54-21-37(50)65)60-43(71)32(20-36(49)64)59-40(68)29(14-15-35(48)63)55-41(69)31(18-24-6-2-1-3-7-24)58-42(70)30(57-38(27)66)19-25-10-12-26(62)13-11-25/h1-3,6-7,10-13,27-34,62H,4-5,8-9,14-23,47H2,(H2,48,63)(H2,49,64)(H2,50,65)(H,54,67)(H,55,69)(H,56,72)(H,57,66)(H,58,70)(H,59,68)(H,60,71)(H4,51,52,53)/t27-,28-,29-,30-,31-,32-,33-,34-/m0/s1; Key:KBZOIRJILGZLEJ-LGYYRGKSSA-N

AVP
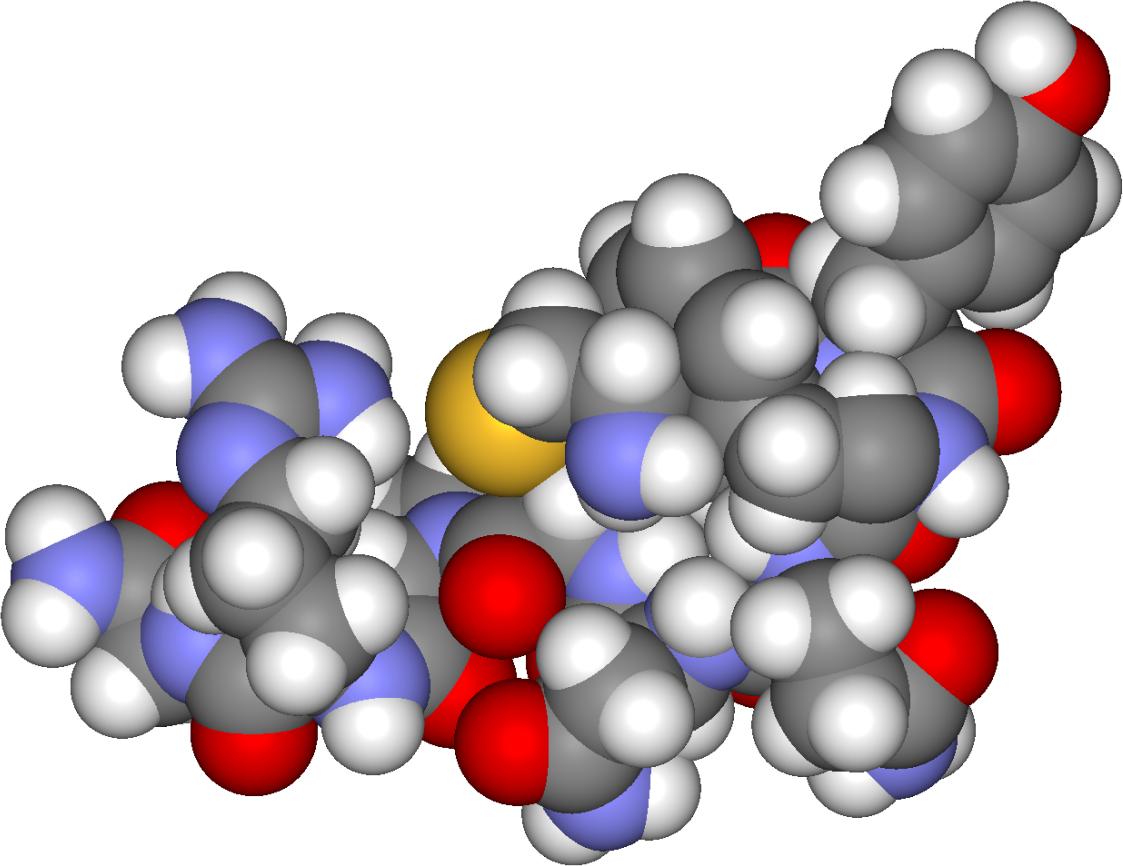

Identifiers
- Aliases: AVP, ADH, ARVP, AVP-NPII, AVRP, VP, AVP gene, AVP (gene), Prepro-AVP-NP II, arginine vasopressin gene, vasopressin gene, prepro-arginine-vasopressin-neurophysin II gene, vasopressin-neurophysin II-copeptin, vasopressin-neurophysin 2-copeptin, prepro-AVP2
- External IDs: OMIM: 192340; MGI: 88121; GeneCards: AVP

Gene location (Human)
Chr.	Chromosome 20 (human)
Band	20p13	Start	3,082,556 bp
Band	20p13	End	3,084,724 bp

Gene location (Mouse)
Chr.	Chromosome 2 (mouse)
Band	2 F1|2 63.24 cM	Start	130,422,540 bp
Band	2 F1|2 63.24 cM	End	130,424,474 bp
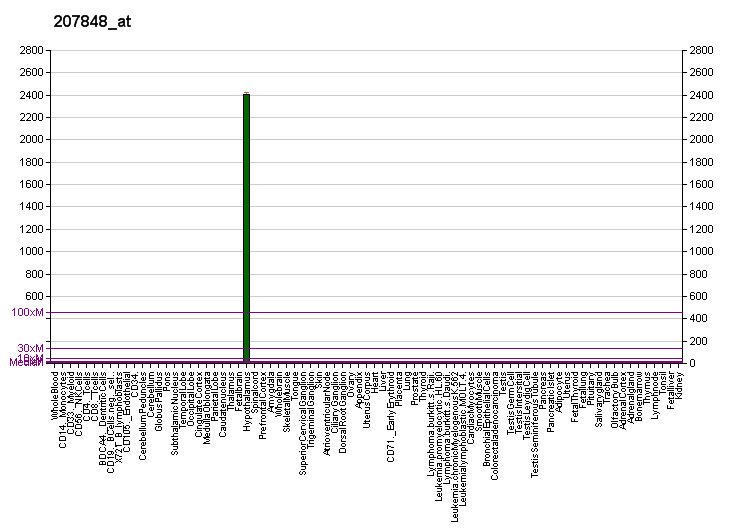
RNA expression pattern
Bgee	Human / Mouse (ortholog); Top expressed in: hypothalamus; internal globus pallidus; gastric mucosa; apex of heart; human kidney; monocyte; left testis; amygdala; anterior pituitary; right adrenal cortex / Top expressed in: paraventricular nucleus of hypothalamus; supraoptic nucleus; arcuate nucleus; optic nerve; median eminence; suprachiasmatic nucleus; nucleus of stria terminalis; ventromedial nucleus; lateral hypothalamus; hair; More reference expression data
BioGPS	More reference expression data
Gene ontology
Molecular function	protein kinase activity; hormone activity; cysteine-type endopeptidase inhibitor activity involved in apoptotic process; neurohypophyseal hormone activity; signaling receptor binding; V1A vasopressin receptor binding; V1B vasopressin receptor binding; neuropeptide hormone activity
Cellular component	extracellular region; cytosol; clathrin-coated vesicle membrane; extracellular space; secretory granule; dendrite
Biological process	negative regulation of cysteine-type endopeptidase activity involved in apoptotic process; vasoconstriction; negative regulation of release of cytochrome c from mitochondria; ERK1 and ERK2 cascade; water transport; cell-cell signaling; negative regulation of apoptotic process; protein kinase C signaling; generation of precursor metabolites and energy; positive regulation of peptidyl-serine phosphorylation; positive regulation of gene expression; renal water homeostasis; signal transduction; apoptotic process; membrane organization; regulation of signaling receptor activity; G protein-coupled receptor signaling pathway; maternal aggressive behavior; positive regulation of systemic arterial blood pressure; positive regulation of cytosolic calcium ion concentration; negative regulation of female receptivity; grooming behavior; locomotory behavior; positive regulation of cell population proliferation; positive regulation of glutamate secretion; response to organic cyclic compound; positive regulation of cell growth; positive regulation of prostaglandin biosynthetic process; positive regulation of cellular pH reduction; response to testosterone; response to nicotine; social behavior; regulation of renal sodium excretion; hyperosmotic salinity response; Maternal behavior; penile erection; response to ethanol; positive regulation of vasoconstriction; multicellular organismal water homeostasis; negative regulation of transmission of nerve impulse
Sources:Amigo / QuickGO
Orthologs
Databases	NCBI: entry; OMA: entry
Species	Human	Mouse
Entrez	551	11998
Ensembl	ENSG00000101200	ENSMUSG00000037727
UniProt	P01185	P35455
RefSeq (mRNA)	NM_000490	NM_009732
RefSeq (protein)	NP_000481	NP_033862
Location (UCSC)	Chr 20: 3.08 – 3.08 Mb	Chr 2: 130.42 – 130.42 Mb
PubMed search
- Wikidata
View/Edit Human	View/Edit Mouse

Mammalian vasopressin, also called antidiuretic hormone (ADH), arginine vasopressin (AVP) or argipressin, is a hormone synthesized from the AVP gene as a peptide prohormone in neurons in the hypothalamus, and is converted to AVP. It then travels down the axon terminating in the posterior pituitary, and is released from vesicles into the circulation in response to extracellular fluid hypertonicity (hyperosmolality). AVP has two primary functions. First, it increases the amount of solute-free water reabsorbed back into the circulation from the filtrate in the kidney tubules of the nephrons. Second, AVP constricts arterioles, which increases peripheral vascular resistance and raises arterial blood pressure.

A third function is possible. Some AVP may be released directly into the brain from the hypothalamus, and may play an important role in social behavior, sexual motivation and pair bonding, and maternal responses to stress.

Vasopressin induces differentiation of stem cells into cardiomyocytes and promotes heart muscle homeostasis.

It has a very short half-life, between 16 and 24 minutes.

== Physiology ==
=== Function ===
Vasopressin regulates the tonicity of body fluids. It is released from the posterior pituitary in response to hypertonicity and causes the kidneys to reabsorb solute-free water and return it to the circulation from the tubules of the nephron, thus returning the tonicity of the body fluids toward normal. An incidental consequence of this renal reabsorption of water is concentrated urine and reduced urine volume. AVP released in high concentrations may also raise blood pressure by inducing moderate vasoconstriction.

AVP also may have a variety of neurological effects on the brain. It may influence pair-bonding in voles. The high-density distributions of vasopressin receptor AVPr1a in prairie vole ventral forebrain regions have been shown to facilitate and coordinate reward circuits during partner preference formation, critical for pair bond formation.

A very similar substance, lysine vasopressin (LVP) or lypressin, has the same function in pigs and its synthetic version was used in human AVP deficiency, although it has been largely replaced by desmopressin.

==== Kidney ====
Vasopressin has three main effects which are:

1. Increasing the water permeability of cortical collecting tubules (CCT), as well as outer and inner medullary collecting duct (OMCD & IMCD) in the kidney, thus allowing water reabsorption and excretion of more concentrated urine, i.e., antidiuresis. This occurs through increased transcription and insertion of water channels (Aquaporin-2) into the apical membrane of collecting tubule and collecting duct epithelial cells. Aquaporins allow water to move down their osmotic gradient and out of the nephron, increasing the amount of water re-absorbed from the filtrate (forming urine) back into the bloodstream. This effect is mediated by V2 receptors. Vasopressin also increases the concentration of calcium in the collecting duct cells, by episodic release from intracellular stores. Vasopressin, acting through cAMP, also increases transcription of the aquaporin-2 gene, thus increasing the total number of aquaporin-2 molecules in collecting duct cells.
2. Increasing permeability of the inner medullary portion of the collecting duct to urea by regulating the cell surface expression of urea transporters, which facilitates its reabsorption into the medullary interstitium as it travels down the concentration gradient created by removing water from the connecting tubule, cortical collecting duct, and outer medullary collecting duct.
3. Acute increase of sodium absorption across the ascending loop of Henle. This adds to the countercurrent multiplication which aids in proper water reabsorption later in the distal tubule and collecting duct.

The hormone vasopressin also stimulates the activity of NKCC2. Vasopressin stimulates sodium chloride reabsorption in the thick ascending limb of the nephron by activating signaling pathways. Vasopressin increases the traffic of NKCC2 to the membrane and phosphorylates some serine and threonine sites on the cytoplasmic N-terminal of the NKCC2 located in the membrane, increasing its activity. Increased NKCC2 activity aids in water reabsorption in the collecting duct through aquaporin 2 channels by creating a hypo-osmotic filtrate.

==== Central nervous system ====
Vasopressin released within the brain may have several actions:

- Vasopressin is released into the brain in a circadian rhythm by neurons of the suprachiasmatic nucleus.
- Vasopressin released from posterior pituitary is associated with nausea.
- Recent evidence suggests that vasopressin may have analgesic effects. The analgesia effects of vasopressin were found to be dependent on both stress and sex.

=== Regulation ===
==== Gene regulation ====
Vasopressin is regulated by AVP gene expression which is managed by major clock controlled genes. In this circadian circuit known as the transcription-translation feedback loop (TTFL), Per2 protein accumulates and is phosphorylated by CK1E. Per2 subsequently inhibits the transcription factors Clock and BMAL1 in order to reduce Per2 protein levels in the cell. At the same time, Per2 also inhibits the transcription factors for the AVP gene in order to regulate its expression, the expression of vasopressin, and other AVP gene products.

Many factors influence the secretion of vasopressin:

- Ethanol (alcohol) reduces the calcium-dependent secretion of AVP by blocking voltage-gated calcium channels in neurohypophyseal nerve terminals in rats.
- Angiotensin II stimulates AVP secretion, in keeping with its general pressor and pro-volumic effects on the body.
- Atrial natriuretic peptide inhibits AVP secretion, in part by inhibiting Angiotensin II-induced stimulation of AVP secretion.
- Cortisol inhibits secretion of antidiuretic hormone.

=== Production and secretion ===
The physiological stimulus for secretion of vasopressin is increased osmolality of the plasma, monitored by the hypothalamus. A decreased arterial blood volume, (such as can occur in cirrhosis, nephrosis, and heart failure), stimulates secretion, even in the face of decreased osmolality of the plasma: it supersedes osmolality, but with a milder effect. In other words, the unloading of arterial baroreceptors when the arterial blood volume is low stimulates vasopressin secretion despite the presence of hypoosmolality (hyponatremia).

The AVP that is measured in peripheral blood is almost all derived from secretion from the posterior pituitary gland (except in cases of AVP-secreting tumours). Vasopressin is produced by magnocellular neurosecretory neurons in the paraventricular nucleus of hypothalamus (PVN) and supraoptic nucleus (SON). It then travels down the axon through the infundibulum within neurosecretory granules that are found within Herring bodies, localized swellings of the axons and nerve terminals. These carry the peptide directly to the posterior pituitary gland, where it is stored until released into the blood.

There are other sources of AVP, beyond the hypothalamic magnocellular neurons. For example, AVP is also synthesized by parvocellular neurosecretory neurons of the PVN, transported and released at the median eminence, from which it travels through the hypophyseal portal system to the anterior pituitary, where it stimulates corticotropic cells synergistically with CRH to produce ACTH (by itself it is a weak secretagogue).

=== Vasopressin during surgery and anaesthesia ===
Vasopressin concentration is used to measure surgical stress for evaluation of surgical techniques. Plasma vasopressin concentration is elevated by noxious stimuli, predominantly during abdominal surgery, especially at gut manipulation, traction of viscera, as well as abdominal insufflation with carbon dioxide during laparoscopic surgery.

=== Receptors ===
Types of AVP receptors and their actions:

Type	Second messenger system	Locations	Actions	Agonists	Antagonists
AVPR1A	Phosphatidylinositol/calcium	Liver, kidney, peripheral vasculature, brain	Vasoconstriction, glycogen breakdown, platelet aggregation, and release of factor VIII and von Willebrand factor; social recognition, circadian tau	Felypressin	
AVPR1B or AVPR3	Phosphatidylinositol/calcium	Pituitary gland, brain	Adrenocorticotropic hormone secretion in response to stress; social interpretation of olfactory cues		
AVPR2	Adenylate cyclase/cAMP	Basolateral membrane of the cells lining the collecting ducts of the kidneys (especially the cortical and outer medullary collecting ducts)	Insertion of aquaporin-2 (AQP2) channels (water channels). This allows water to be reabsorbed down an osmotic gradient, and so the urine is more concentrated. Release of von Willebrand factor and surface expression of P-selectin through exocytosis of Weibel-Palade bodies from endothelial cells	AVP, desmopressin	"-vaptan" diuretics, i.e. tolvaptan

=== Structure and relation to oxytocin ===
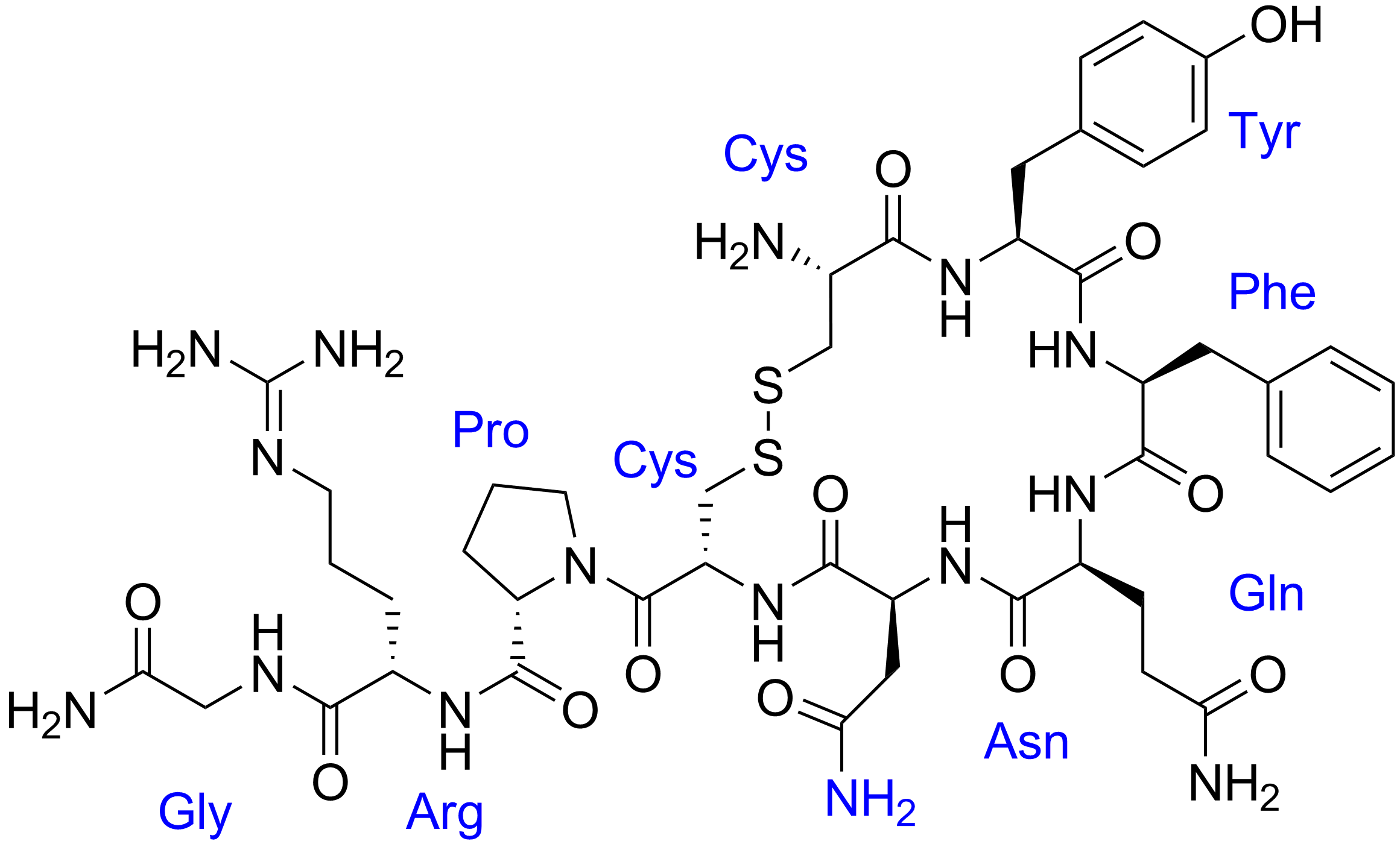
Chemical structure of the arginine vasopressin (argipressin) with an arginine at the 8th amino acid position. Lysine vasopressin differs only in having a lysine in this position.

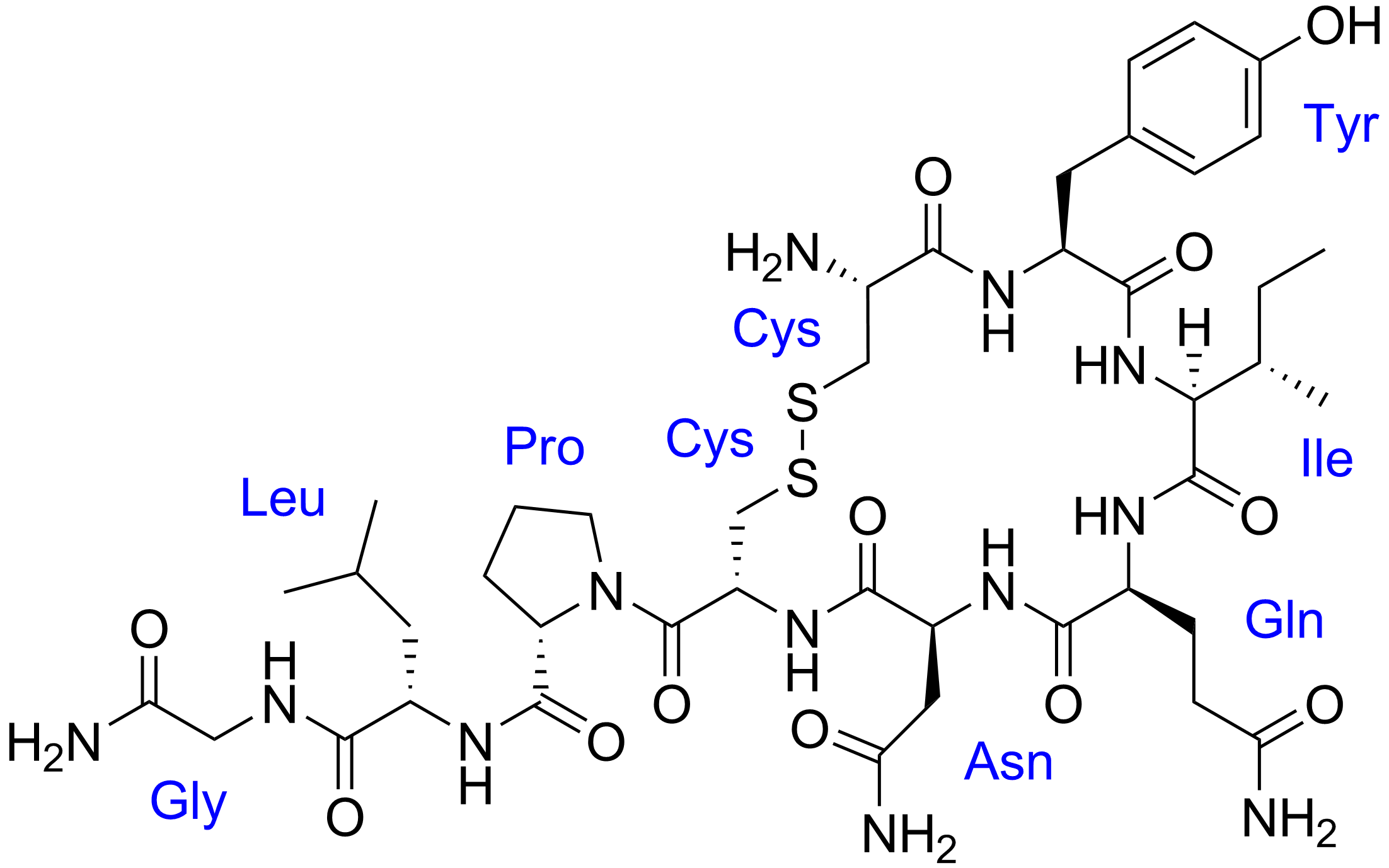
Chemical structure of oxytocin. Differs from AVP at only the 3rd and 8th position.

The vasopressins are peptides consisting of nine amino acids (nonapeptides). The amino acid sequence of arginine vasopressin (argipressin) is Cys-Tyr-Phe-Gln-Asn-Cys-Pro-Arg-Gly-NH_{2}, with the cysteine residues forming a disulfide bond and the C-terminus of the sequence converted to a primary amide. Lysine vasopressin (lypressin) has a lysine in place of the arginine as the eighth amino acid, and is found in pigs and some related animals, whereas arginine vasopressin is found in humans.

The structure of oxytocin is very similar to that of the vasopressins: It is also a nonapeptide with a disulfide bridge and its amino acid sequence differs at only two positions. The two genes are located on the same chromosome separated by a relatively small distance of less than 15,000 bases in most species. The magnocellular neurons that secrete vasopressin are adjacent to magnocellular neurons that secrete oxytocin, and are similar in many respects. The similarity of the two peptides can cause some cross-reactions: oxytocin has a slight antidiuretic function, and high levels of AVP can cause uterine contractions.

Comparison of vasopressin and oxytocin neuropeptide families:

Vertebrate Vasopressin Family
Cys-Tyr-Phe-Gln-Asn-Cys-Pro-Arg-Gly-NH_{2}	Argipressin (AVP, ADH)	Most mammals
Cys-Tyr-Phe-Gln-Asn-Cys-Pro-Lys-Gly-NH_{2}	Lypressin (LVP)	Pigs, hippos, warthogs, some marsupials
Cys-Phe-Phe-Gln-Asn-Cys-Pro-Arg-Gly-NH_{2}	Phenypressin	Some marsupials
Cys-Tyr-Ile-Gln-Asn-Cys-Pro-Arg-Gly-NH_{2}	Vasotocin†	Non-mammals
Vertebrate Oxytocin Family
Cys-Tyr-Ile-Gln-Asn-Cys-Pro-Leu-Gly-NH_{2}	Oxytocin (OXT)	Most mammals, ratfish
Cys-Tyr-Ile-Gln-Asn-Cys-Pro-Pro-Gly-NH_{2}	Prol-Oxytocin	Some New World monkeys, northern tree shrews
Cys-Tyr-Ile-Gln-Asn-Cys-Pro-Ile-Gly-NH_{2}	Mesotocin	Most marsupials, all birds, reptiles, amphibians, lungfishes, coelacanths
Cys-Tyr-Ile-Gln-Ser-Cys-Pro-Ile-Gly-NH_{2}	Seritocin	Frogs
Cys-Tyr-Ile-Ser-Asn-Cys-Pro-Ile-Gly-NH_{2}	Isotocin	Bony fishes
Cys-Tyr-Ile-Ser-Asn-Cys-Pro-Gln-Gly-NH_{2}	Glumitocin	skates
Cys-Tyr-Ile-Asn/Gln-Asn-Cys-Pro-Leu/Val-Gly-NH_{2}	Various tocins	Sharks
Invertebrate VP/OT Superfamily
Cys-Leu-Ile-Thr-Asn-Cys-Pro-Arg-Gly-NH_{2}	Inotocin	Locust
Cys-Phe-Val-Arg-Asn-Cys-Pro-Thr-Gly-NH_{2}	Annetocin	Earthworm
Cys-Phe-Ile-Arg-Asn-Cys-Pro-Lys-Gly-NH_{2}	Lys-Connopressin	Geography & imperial cone snail, pond snail, sea hare, leech
Cys-Ile-Ile-Arg-Asn-Cys-Pro-Arg-Gly-NH_{2}	Arg-Connopressin	Striped cone snail
Cys-Tyr-Phe-Arg-Asn-Cys-Pro-Ile-Gly-NH_{2}	Cephalotocin	Octopus
Cys-Phe-Trp-Thr-Ser-Cys-Pro-Ile-Gly-NH_{2}	Octopressin	Octopus
†Vasotocin is the evolutionary progenitor of all the vertebrate neurohypophysial hormones.

== Medical use ==
Vasopressin is used to manage anti-diuretic hormone deficiency. Vasopressin is used to treat diabetes insipidus related to low levels of antidiuretic hormone. It is available as Pressyn.

Vasopressin has off-label uses and is used in the treatment of vasodilatory shock, gastrointestinal bleeding, ventricular tachycardia and ventricular fibrillation.

Vasopressin agonists are used therapeutically in various conditions, and its long-acting synthetic analogue desmopressin is used in conditions featuring low vasopressin secretion, as well as for control of bleeding (in some forms of von Willebrand disease and in mild haemophilia A) and in extreme cases of bedwetting by children. Terlipressin and related analogues are used as vasoconstrictors in certain conditions. Use of vasopressin analogues for esophageal varices commenced in 1970.

Vasopressin infusions are also used as second line therapy for septic shock patients not responding to fluid resuscitation or infusions of catecholamines (e.g., dopamine or norepinephrine) to increase the blood pressure while sparing the use of catecholamines. These argipressins have much shorter elimination half-life (around 20 minutes) comparing to synthetic non-arginine vasopresines with much longer elimination half-life of many hours. Further, argipressins act on V1a, V1b, and V2 receptors which consequently lead to higher eGFR and lower vascular resistance in the lungs. A number of injectable arginine vasopressins are currently in clinical use in the United States and in Europe.

=== Pharmacokinetics ===
Vasopressin is administered through an intravenous device, intramuscular injection or a subcutaneous injection. The duration of action depends on the mode of administration and ranges from thirty minutes to two hours. It has a half life of ten to twenty minutes. It is widely distributed throughout the body and remains in the extracellular fluid. It is degraded by the liver and excreted through the kidneys. Arginin vasopressins for use in septic shock are intended for intravenous use only.

=== Side effects ===
The most common side effects during treatment with vasopressin are dizziness, angina, chest pain, abdominal cramps, heartburn, nausea, vomiting, trembling, fever, water intoxication, pounding sensation in the head, diarrhoea, sweating, paleness, and flatulence. The most severe adverse reactions are myocardial infarction and hypersensitivity.

=== Contraindications ===
The use of lysine vasopressin is contraindicated in the presence of hypersensitivity to beef or pork proteins, increased BUN and chronic kidney failure. It is recommended that it be cautiously used in instances of perioperative polyuria, sensitivity to the drug, asthma, seizures, heart failure, a comatose state, migraine headaches, and cardiovascular disease.

=== Interactions ===
- alcohol - may lower the antidiuretic effect
- carbamazepine, chloropropamide, clofibrate, tricyclic antidepressants and fludrocortisone may raise the antidiuretic effect
- lithium, demeclocycline, heparin or norepinephrine may lower the antidiuretic effect
- vasopressor effect may be higher with the concurrent use of ganglionic blocking medications

=== Deficiency ===
Decreased AVP release (neurogenic — i.e. due to alcohol intoxication or tumour) or decreased renal sensitivity to AVP (nephrogenic, i.e. by mutation of V2 receptor or AQP) leads to diabetes insipidus, a condition featuring hypernatremia (increased blood sodium concentration), polyuria (excess urine production), and polydipsia (thirst).

=== Excess ===
Syndrome of Inappropriate Antidiuretic Hormone secretion (SIADH) in turn can be caused by a number of problems. Some forms of cancer can cause SIADH, particularly small cell lung carcinoma but also a number of other tumors. A variety of diseases affecting the brain or the lung (infections, bleeding) can be the driver behind SIADH. A number of drugs have been associated with SIADH, such as certain antidepressants (serotonin reuptake inhibitors and tricyclic antidepressants), the anticonvulsant carbamazepine, oxytocin (used to induce and stimulate labor), and the chemotherapy drug vincristine. It has also been associated with fluoroquinolones (including ciprofloxacin and moxifloxacin). Finally, it can occur without a clear explanation. Hyponatremia can be treated pharmaceutically through the use of vasopressin receptor antagonists.

== History ==
Vasopressin was elucidated and synthesized for the first time by Vincent du Vigneaud.

== Animal studies ==
Evidence for an effect of AVP on monogamy vs polygamy comes from experimental studies in several species, which indicate that the precise distribution of vasopressin and vasopressin receptors in the brain is associated with species-typical patterns of social behavior. In particular, there are consistent differences between monogamous species and polygamous species in the distribution of AVP receptors, and sometimes in the distribution of vasopressin-containing axons, even when closely related species are compared.

== Human studies ==
Vasopressin has shown nootropic effects on pain perception and cognitive function. Vasopressin also plays a role in autism, major depressive disorder, bipolar disorder, and schizophrenia.

== See also ==
- Syndrome of inappropriate antidiuretic hormone secretion (SIADH)
- Oxytocin
- Vasopressin receptor
- Vasopressin receptor antagonists
- Copeptin
- Anterior pituitary
- Hypothalamus
- Atrial natriuretic peptide: When the atrium stretches, blood pressure is considered to be increased and sodium is excreted to lower blood pressure.
- Renin-angiotensin system: When the blood flow through the juxtaglomerular apparatus decreases, blood pressure is considered low, and the adrenal cortex secretes aldosterone to increase sodium reabsorption in the collecting duct, thereby increasing blood pressure.
- Bainbridge reflex: In response to stretching of the right atrium wall, heart rate increases, lowering venous blood pressure.
- Baroreflex: When the stretch receptors in the aortic arch and carotid sinus increase, the blood pressure is considered to be elevated and the heart rate decreases to lower blood pressure.
