= Satavaptan =

Chemical compound

Clinical data
- Other names: SR121463
- ATC code: none

Identifiers
- IUPAC name: N-(tert-butyl)-4-{[(1s,4s)-5'-ethoxy-4-(2-morpholin-4-ylethoxy)-2'-oxospiro[cyclohexane-1,3'-indol]-1'(2'H)-yl]sulfonyl}-3-methoxybenzamide
- CAS Number: 185913-78-4
- PubChem CID: 9810773
- ChemSpider: 32699105
- UNII: AJS8S3P31H
- ECHA InfoCard: 100.211.853

Chemical and physical data
- Formula: C_{33}H_{45}N_{3}O_{8}S
- Molar mass: 643.80 g·mol^{−1}
- 3D model (JSmol): Interactive image
- SMILES: C1COCCN1CCO[C@H]2CC[C@](CC2)3c4cc(OCC)ccc4N(C3=O)S(=O)(=O)c5ccc(cc5OC)C(=O)NC(C)(C)C
- InChI: InChI=1S/C33H45N3O8S/c1-6-43-25-8-9-27-26(22-25)33(13-11-24(12-14-33)44-20-17-35-15-18-42-19-16-35)31(38)36(27)45(39,40)29-10-7-23(21-28(29)41-5)30(37)34-32(2,3)4/h7-10,21-22,24H,6,11-20H2,1-5H3,(H,34,37)/t24-,33+; Key:QKXJWFOKVQWEDZ-VCCCEUOBSA-N

Satavaptan (INN; developmental code name SR121463, former tentative brand name Aquilda) is a vasopressin V_{2} receptor antagonist which was investigation by Sanofi-Aventis and was under development for the treatment of hyponatremia. It was also being studied for the treatment of ascites. Development was discontinued in 2009.
