= Mozavaptan =

Chemical compound

Clinical data
- Routes of administration: Oral
- ATC code: none

Legal status
- Legal status: In general: ℞ (Prescription only)

Identifiers
- IUPAC name: N-[4-(5-Dimethylamino-2,3,4,5-tetrahydro-1-benzazepine-1-carbonyl)phenyl]-2-methylbenzamide
- CAS Number: 137975-06-5
- PubChem CID: 119369
- IUPHAR/BPS: 2197
- ChemSpider: 106618
- UNII: 17OJ42922Y
- ChEMBL: ChEMBL420762
- CompTox Dashboard (EPA): DTXSID8057641

Chemical and physical data
- Formula: C_{27}H_{29}N_{3}O_{2}
- Molar mass: 427.548 g·mol^{−1}
- 3D model (JSmol): Interactive image
- SMILES: Cc1ccccc1C(=O)Nc2ccc(cc2)C(=O)N3c4ccccc4C(CCC3)N(C)C
- InChI: InChI=1S/C27H29N3O2/c1-19-9-4-5-10-22(19)26(31)28-21-16-14-20(15-17-21)27(32)30-18-8-13-24(29(2)3)23-11-6-7-12-25(23)30/h4-7,9-12,14-17,24H,8,13,18H2,1-3H3,(H,28,31); Key:WRNXUQJJCIZICJ-UHFFFAOYSA-N

Mozavaptan (INN) is a vasopressin receptor antagonist marketed by Otsuka. In Japan, it was approved in October 2006 for hyponatremia (low blood sodium levels) caused by syndrome of inappropriate antidiuretic hormone (SIADH) due to ADH producing tumors.
