= Vasopressin receptor 1A =

Protein-coding gene in the species Homo sapiens

AVPR1A

Identifiers
- Aliases: AVPR1A, AVPR V1a, AVPR1, V1aR, arginine vasopressin receptor 1A, Vasopressin receptor 1A, V1a vasopressin receptor, antidiuretic hormone receptor 1A, SCCL vasopressin subtype 1a receptor, V1-vascular vasopressin receptor vascular/hepatic-type arginine vasopressin receptor
- External IDs: OMIM: 600821; MGI: 1859216; GeneCards: AVPR1A
Available structures
PDB	Ortholog search: PDBe RCSB
PDB	List of PDB id codes 1YTV

Gene location (Human)
Chr.	Chromosome 12 (human)
Band	12q14.2	Start	63,142,759 bp
Band	12q14.2	End	63,151,201 bp

Gene location (Mouse)
Chr.	Chromosome 10 (mouse)
Band	10|10 D2	Start	122,284,404 bp
Band	10|10 D2	End	122,289,357 bp
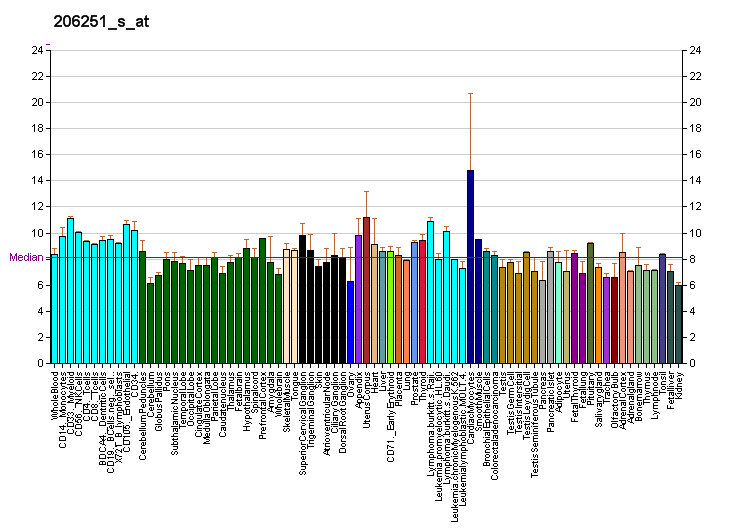

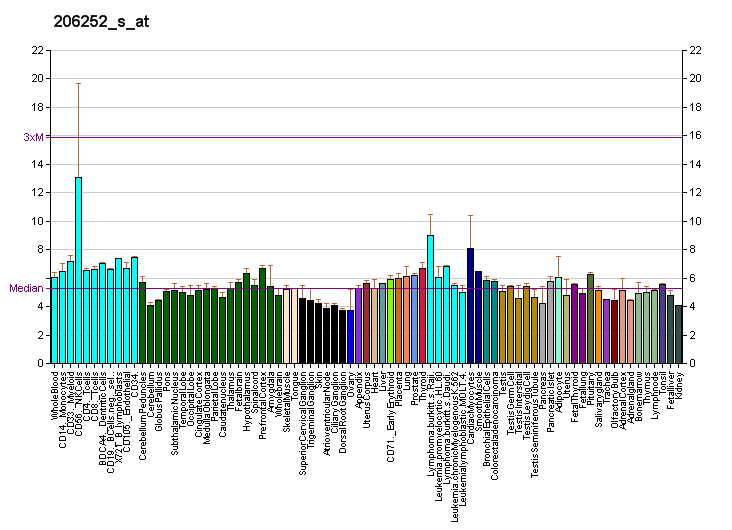

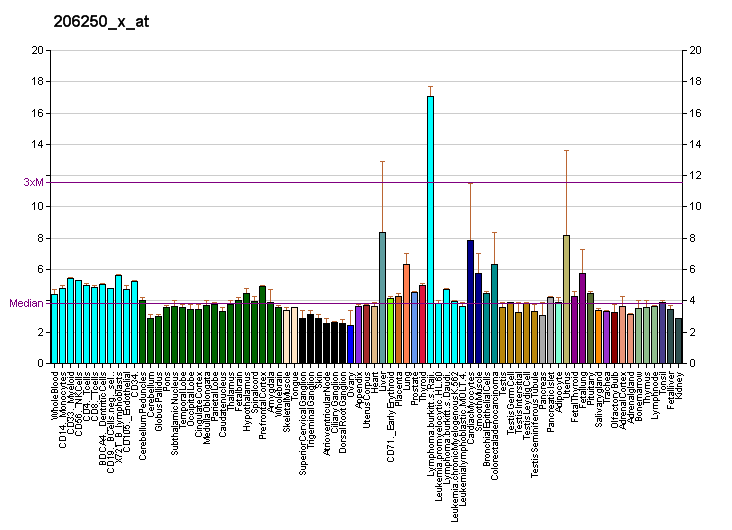
RNA expression pattern
Bgee	Human / Mouse (ortholog); Top expressed in: left adrenal gland; left adrenal cortex; popliteal artery; tibial arteries; parietal pleura; right adrenal gland; skin of hip; right adrenal cortex; adipose tissue; abdominal fat / Top expressed in: liver; suprachiasmatic nucleus; upper lip; skin of external ear; right kidney; left lobe of liver; urinary bladder; genital tubercle; maxillary prominence; intercostal muscle; More reference expression data
BioGPS	More reference expression data
Gene ontology
Molecular function	signal transducer activity; protein kinase C binding; peptide hormone binding; V1A vasopressin receptor binding; G protein-coupled receptor activity; peptide binding; protein binding; vasopressin receptor activity
Cellular component	integral component of membrane; integral component of plasma membrane; membrane; cytoplasmic vesicle; endosome; plasma membrane
Biological process	ejaculation; telencephalon development; negative regulation of female receptivity; cellular response to hormone stimulus; generation of precursor metabolites and energy; blood circulation; negative regulation of transmission of nerve impulse; cellular response to water deprivation; signal transduction; activation of phospholipase C activity; positive regulation of heart rate; positive regulation of systemic arterial blood pressure; response to corticosterone; myotube differentiation; positive regulation of prostaglandin biosynthetic process; positive regulation of blood pressure; positive regulation of cell growth; penile erection; positive regulation of cellular pH reduction; positive regulation of cell population proliferation; social behavior; grooming behavior; response to inorganic substance; calcium-mediated signaling; maternal aggressive behavior; positive regulation of glutamate secretion; response to organic substance; response to peptide; positive regulation of renal sodium excretion; positive regulation of cytosolic calcium ion concentration; G protein-coupled receptor signaling pathway; regulation of systemic arterial blood pressure by vasopressin; Maternal behavior; positive regulation of vasoconstriction
Sources:Amigo / QuickGO
Orthologs
Databases	NCBI: entry; OMA: entry
Species	Human	Mouse
Entrez	552	54140
Ensembl	ENSG00000166148	ENSMUSG00000020123
UniProt	P37288	Q62463
RefSeq (mRNA)	NM_000706	NM_016847
RefSeq (protein)	NP_000697	NP_058543
Location (UCSC)	Chr 12: 63.14 – 63.15 Mb	Chr 10: 122.28 – 122.29 Mb
PubMed search
- Wikidata
View/Edit Human	View/Edit Mouse

Vasopressin receptor 1A (V1AR), or arginine vasopressin receptor 1A (officially called AVPR1A) is one of the three major receptor types for vasopressin (AVPR1B and AVPR2 being the others), and is present throughout the brain, as well as in the periphery in the liver, kidney, and vasculature.

AVPR1A is also known as:

- V1a vasopressin receptor
- antidiuretic hormone receptor 1A
- SCCL vasopressin subtype 1a receptor
- V1-vascular vasopressin receptor AVPR1A
- vascular/hepatic-type arginine vasopressin receptor

== Structure and function ==
Human AVPR1A cDNA is 1472 bp long and encodes a 418 amino-acid long polypeptide which shares 72%, 36%, 37%, and 45% sequence identity with rat AVPR1A, human AVPR2, rat AVPR2, and human oxytocin receptor (OXTR), respectively. AVPR1A is a G-protein coupled receptor (GPCR) with 7 transmembrane domains that couples to Gaq/11 guanosine triphosphate (GTP) binding proteins, which along with Gbl, activate phospholipase C activity. Clinically, the V1A receptor is related to vasoconstriction compared to the V1B receptor that is more related to adrenocorticotropic hormone (ACTH) release or the V2 receptor that is linked to the antidiuretic function of antidiuretic hormone (ADH).

== Ligand binding ==
In the N-terminal juxtamembrane segment of the AVPR1A, the glutamate residue at position 54 (E54) and the arginine residue at position 46 (R46) are critical for binding with arginine vasopressin (AVP) and AVP agonists, with E54 likely to interact with AVP and R46 to contribute to a conformational switch.

Competitors of [^{125}I]Tyr-Phaa-specific binding to AVPR1A include:

- Linear V1a antagonist phenylacetyl-D-Tyr(Et)-Phe-Gln-Asn-Lys-Pro-Arg-NH_{2} (K_{i} = 1.2 ± 0.2 nM)
- Relcovaptan (SR-49059) (K_{i} = 1.3 ± 0.2 nM)
- AVP (K_{i} = 1.8 ± 0.4 nM)
- Linear V1a antagonist phenylacetyl-D-Tyr(Et)-Phe-Val-Asn-Lys-Pro-Tyr-NH_{2} (Ki = 3.0 ± 0.5 nM)
- V2 antagonist d(CH_{2})_{5}-[D-Ile^{2}, Ile^{4}, Ala-NH_{2}]AVP (K_{i} = 68 ± 17 nM)
- Oxytocin (K_{i} = 129 ± 22 nM)

The AVPR1A is endocytosed by binding to beta-arrestin, which dissociates rapidly from AVPR1A to allow it to return to the plasma membrane; however, upon activation, AVPR1A can heterodimerize with AVPR2 to increase beta-arrestin-mediated endocytosis (and intracellular accumulation) of AVPR1A, since AVPR2 is far less likely to dissociate from beta-arrestin.

== Role in behavior ==
The activity of genetic variants of the AVPR1A gene might be related to generosity and altruistic behavior. Nature News has referred to AVPR1A as the "ruthlessness gene".

=== Prairie vs. montane voles ===
The injection of oxytocin (OXT) vs. oxytocin antagonist (OTA) at birth has sexually dimorphic effects in prairie voles later on in life in various areas of the brain.

Males treated with OXT showed increases in AVPR1A in the ventral pallidum, lateral septum, and cingulate cortex, while females showed decreases; males treated with an OTA showed decreases in AVPR1A in the bed nucleus of the stria terminalis, medial preoptic area of the hypothalamus, and lateral septum.

Although the AVPR1A coding region is 99% identical between prairie and montane voles, and binding and second messenger activity does not differ, patterns of distribution of AVPR1A differ drastically.

=== Mice ===
Male knockout mice in AVPR1A have reduced anxiety-like behavior and greatly impaired social recognition abilities, without any defects in spatial and nonsocial olfactory learning and memory tasks, as measured by the elevated plus maze, light/dark box, Morris water maze, forced swim, baseline acoustic startle and prepulse inhibition (PPI), and olfactory habituation tests. Some studies have shown AVPR1A knockout mice to have deficits in their circadian rhythms and olfaction.

AVPR1A's role in social recognition is particularly important in the lateral septum, as using viral vectors to replace inactivated AVPR1A expression rescues social recognition and increases anxiety-related behavior. However, conflicting results have been found in another study. Also, unlike vasopressin 1b receptor and oxytocin knockout mice, AVPR1A knockout mice have a normal Bruce effect (appropriate failure of pregnancy in presence of novel male).

Although activation of AVPR1A is a major mediator of anxiogenesis in males, it is not in females.

=== Rats ===
AVPR1A transcripts are diurnally expressed 12 hours out of phase from vasopressin expression in vasopressin and vasoactive intestinal polypeptide neurons of the suprachiasmatic nucleus in both vasopressin-normal Sprague-Dawley rats, as well as vasopressin-deficient Brattleboro rats.

Rats with reduced AVPR1A in the bed nucleus of the stria terminalis have increased incidences of the isolation potentiated startle, a measure of isolation-induced anxiety.

Subchronic phencyclidine (PCP) treatment (which induces symptoms similar to those of schizophrenia) reduces AVPR1A density in many brain regions, implying there might be a role for AVPR1A in schizophrenia.

AVPR1A is present in the lateral septum, neocortical layer IV, hippocampal formation, amygdalostriatal area, bed nucleus of the stria terminalis, suprachiasmatic nucleus, ventral tegmental area, substantia nigra, superior colliculus, dorsal raphe, nucleus of the solitary tract, spinal cord, and inferior olive, while mRNA transcripts for AVPR1A are found in the olfactory bulb, hippocampal formation, lateral septum, suprachiasmatic nucleus, paraventricular nucleus, anterior hypothalamic area, arcuate nucleus, lateral habenula, ventral tegmental area, substantia nigra (pars compacta), superior colliculus, raphe nuclei, locus coeruleus, inferior olive, choroid plexus, endothelial cells, area postrema and nucleus of the solitary tract.

=== Humans ===
Although vasopressin cell and fiber distribution patterns are highly conserved across species (with centrally projecting systems being sexually dimorphic), the vasopressin receptor AVPR1A distribution differs both between and within species; vasopressin production occurs in the hypothalamus, bed nucleus of the stria terminalis, and the medial amygdala (projecting to the lateral septum and ventral pallidum), while vasopressin binding sites in humans are in the lateral septum, thalamus, basal amygdaloid nucleus, and brainstem, but not cortex.

Human AVPR1A is situated on chromosome 12q14-15, and the promoter region does not have repeat sequences homologous to those found in prairie voles. Three polymorphic repetitive sequences have been found in humans in the 5' flanking region: RS3, RS1, and a (GT)25 dinucleotide repeat.

A 2015 study found a correlation between AVPR1A expression and predisposition to extra-pair mating in women but not in men.

== Polymorphisms ==
=== RS3 ===
The AVPR1A repeat polymorphism RS3 is a complex (CT)4-TT-(CT)8-(GT)24 repeat that is 3625 bp upstream of the transcription start site.

Homozygosity in allele 334 of RS3 is associated in men (but not women) with problems with pair-bonding behavior, measured by traits such as partner bonding, perceived marital problems, marital status, as well as spousal perception of marital quality.

In a study of 203 male and female university students, participants with short (308–325 bp) vs. long (327–343) versions of RS3 were less generous, as measured by lower scores on both money allocations in the dictator game, as well as by self-report with the Bardi-Schwartz Universalism and Benevolence Value-expressive Behavior Scales; although the precise functional significance of longer AVPR1A RS3 repeats is not known, they are associated with higher AVPR1A postmortem hippocampal mRNA levels.

Relative to all other alleles, the 334 allele of RS3 shows overactivation of left amygdala (in response to fearful face stimuli), with longer variants of RS3 additionally associated with stronger amygdala activation.

=== RS1 ===
The AVPR1A repeat polymorphism RS1 is a (GATA)14 tetranucleotide repeat that is 553 bp upstream from the transcription start site. Allele 320 in RS1 is associated with increased novelty seeking and decreased harm avoidance; additionally, relative to all other alleles, the 320 allele of RS1 showed significantly less activity in the left amygdala, with shorter variants showing a trend of stronger activity.

=== Other microsatellites ===
The AGAT polymorphism is associated with age of first intercourse in females, with those homozygous for long repeats more likely to have sex before age 15 than any other genotype. However, there is no evidence of preferential transmission of AVPR1A microsatellite repeats to hypersexual or uninhibited people-seeking.

Polymorphisms in AVPR1A have also been shown to be associated with social interaction skills, and have been linked to such diverse traits as dancing and musical ability, altruism and autism.

Chimpanzee populations have individuals with single (only (GT)25 microsatellite) and duplicated (the (GT)25 microsatellite as well as the RS3) alleles, with allele frequencies of 0.795 and 0.205, respectively.
