= Phil S. Baran =

American organic chemist (born 1977)

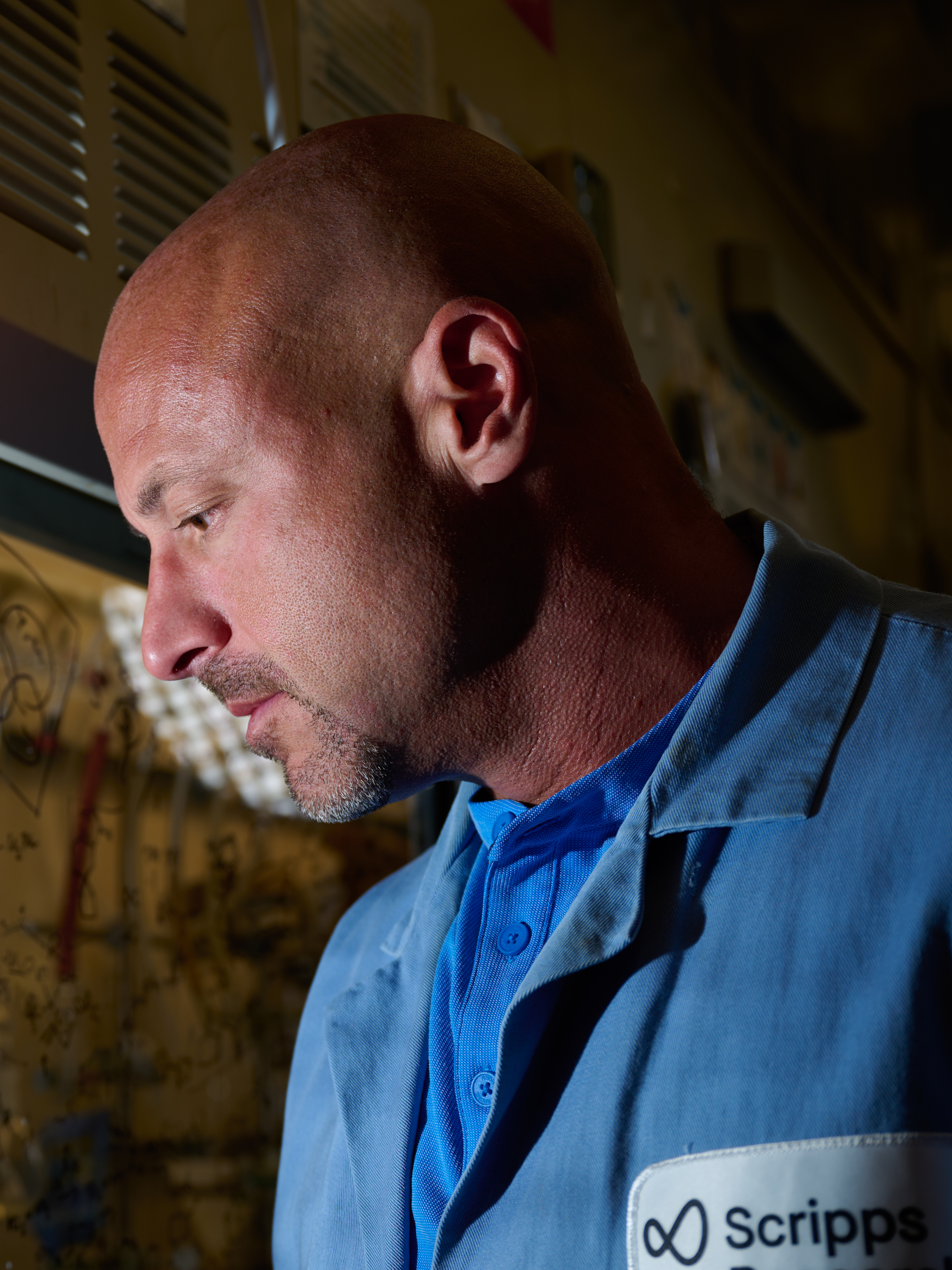
- Born: August 10, 1977 (age 49); Denville, New Jersey, U.S.
- Education: Lake Sumter Community College (AA, 1995); New York University (BS, 1997); Scripps Research Institute (PhD, 2001)
- Scientific career
- Fields: Chemistry
- Workplaces: Skaggs Institute for Chemical Biology

Phil S. Baran (born August 10, 1977) is a synthetic organic chemist and Professor in the Department of Chemistry at the Scripps Research Institute. His work is focused on synthesizing complex natural products, the development of new reaction methodologies within synthetic organic electrochemistry, and the development of new reagents. He holds several patents and has authored over 300 research articles.

== Early life and education ==
Phil S. Baran was born in Denville, New Jersey, on August 10, 1977, and grew up in Coral Springs, Florida. He was not a strong academic student in high school, but developed early interests in creative pursuits like role-playing games, computer programming, and Lego building.

Encouraged by his chemistry teacher to experiment after school, Baran quickly channeled his creativity into crafting molecules. In 1995 he began a chemistry degree at New York University, and enthusiastically accepted David Schuster's offer to work in his lab, synthesizing compounds that linked C60 with porphyrins to make artificial photosynthetic systems. He received his BS in chemistry from New York University in 1997.

He went on to earn his PhD from The Scripps Research Institute in 2001, under the supervision of K. C. Nicolaou, an experience he recalls was 'like hardcore Navy Seal training' and where he co-authored 30 papers in less than four years.

He then pursued a postdoctoral fellowship in the laboratory of Nobel Laureate Elias James Corey at Harvard University who reflected on Baran's time in his lab, saying, "He had a phenomenal grasp of synthetic chemistry," and "felt that he could be a leader in his generation."

Baran is married to Mariana Baran and has four children.

== Independent academic career ==
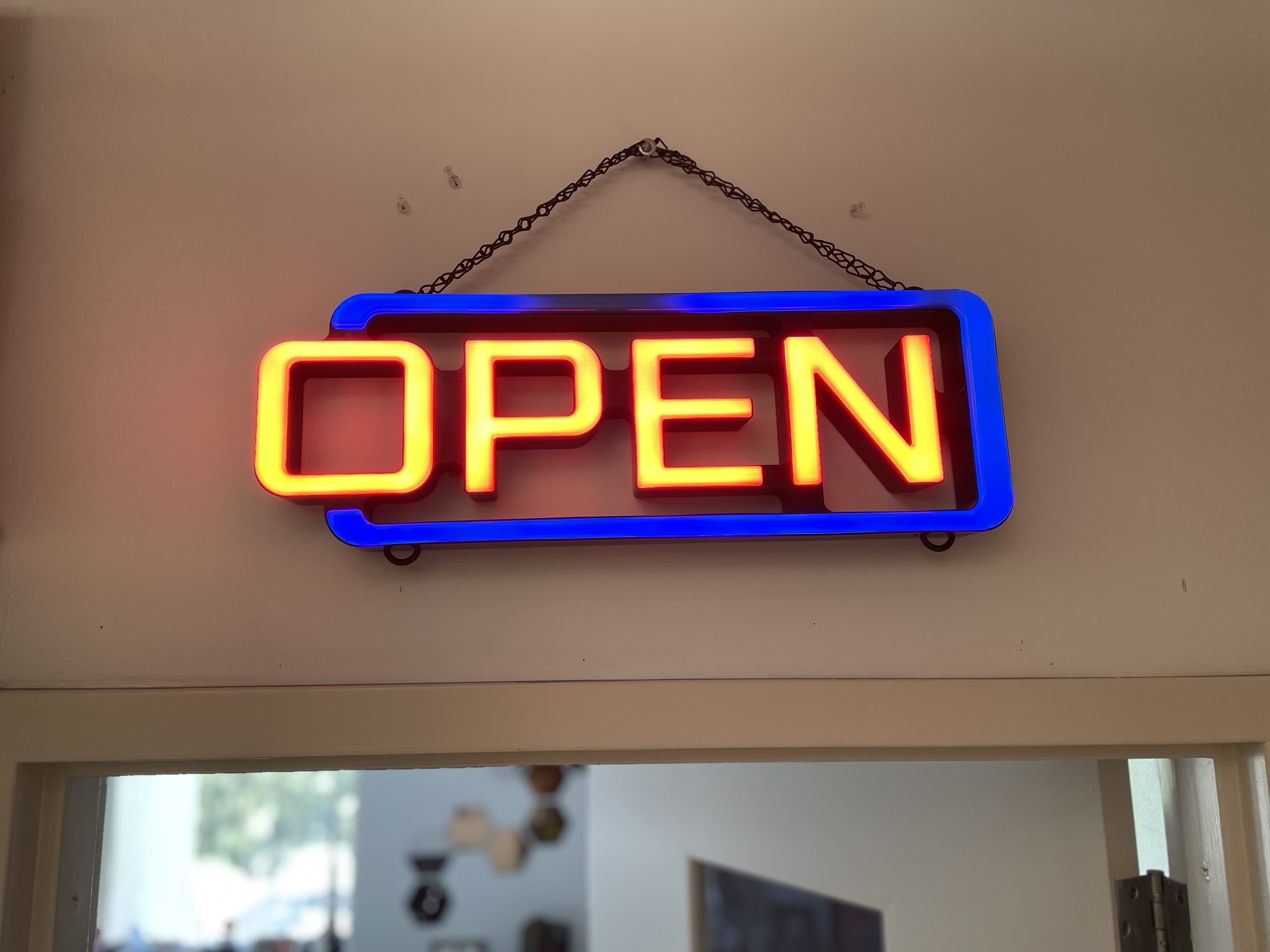
Neon OPEN sign above Phil Baran's office door

Baran began his independent career at the Scripps Research Institute in the summer of 2003, and received tenure just three years later. In the 20 years since then, he has supervised over 300 graduate students, post-doctoral scholars, visiting scholars and interns. He is currently the Dr. Richard A. Lerner Endowed Chair at Scripps Research

His work is focused on practicality and simplicity in the total synthesis of organic molecules, eschewing protecting groups, functional group manipulations, and non-essential redox manipulations. Additionally, since the mid 2010's, Baran's lab has focused on developing electrochemical methodologies for use in total synthesis and medicinal chemistry as it allows for more atom economical and environmentally-conscious protocols.

Baran has given hundreds of talks all over the world and is the recipient of dozens of distinguished awards. Among many honors, he has notably earned the Amgen Young Investigator Award (2005), ACS Award in Pure Chemistry (2010), the MacArthur Fellowship (2013), the Mukaiyama Award (2014), the ACS Elias J. Corey Award (2016), the Danisco Science Excellence Medal Award (2022), and the Edison Patent Award (2023).

== Industry career and collaborations ==
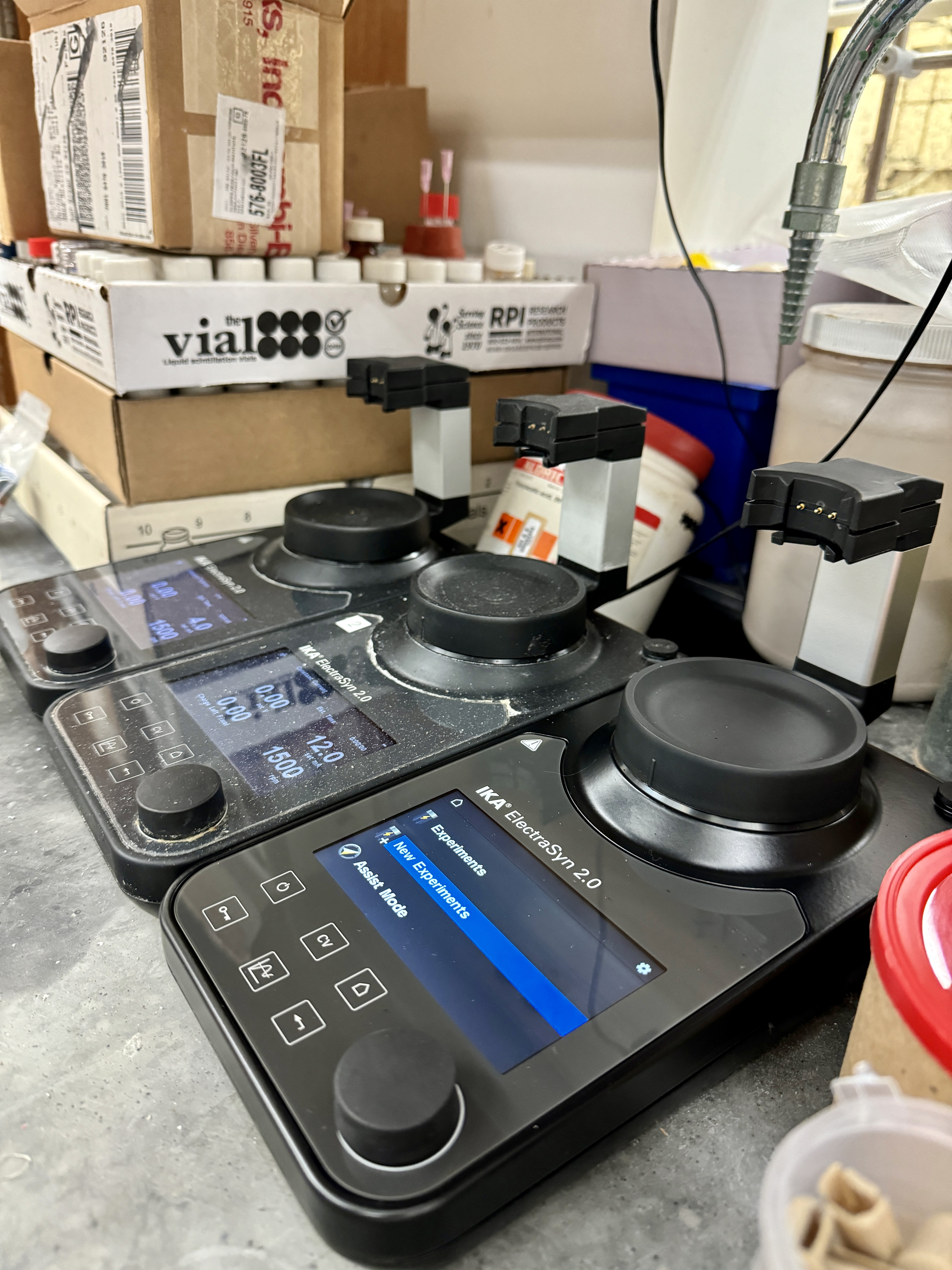
IKA ElectraSyn 2.0

In addition to his academic work, Baran also holds many accolades in industry as a scientific entrepreneur, company co-founder, consultant and scientific advisor. He co-founded his first company Sirenas Marine Discovery in 2012 alongside Eduardo Esquenazi and Jake Beverage —a company that is focused on marine-inspired small molecules and pre-clinical leads for cancer, HIV, and infectious diseases. In 2016, he joined forces with fellow Scripps colleagues, Benjamin F. Cravatt and Jin-Quan Yu to co-found Vividion Therapeutics with the goal of identifying small molecules that bind currently undrugged targets via a covalent-first chemoproteomics approach. Vividion was sold to Bayer in 2021 for up to $2 billion ($1.5 billion with an additional $500 million in milestone payments). In the same year, Baran founded Elsie Biotechnologies, an antisense oligonucleotide (ASO)-based company with the goal of discovering therapeutic agents that can achieve desirable medicinal effects not attainable with existing drugs by modulating gene expression of DNA or RNA. Elsie Biotechnologies was sold to GlaxoSmithKline (GSK) in 2024 for $50 million. Baran also co-founded and is on the scientific advisory team of Galileo Biosystems, a preclinical stage biopharmaceutical company focused on developing therapeutic agents for inflammatory and autoimmune diseases. He also serves on the scientific advisory board for seven additional companies (Eisai, Kemxtree, Quanta Therapeutics, Inc., Alkermes, Inc, Nutcracker Therapeutics, Inc., Hongene Biotech Corporation, Shouxin, and Sage Therapeutics) and has consulted for over twenty more, including presently at Bristol-Meyers-Squibb, Gilead, and BASF Corporation.

In 2014, Baran began a partnership with IKA, a laboratory equipment manufacturer, to bring to market equipment designed to standardize electrochemical protocols and make electrochemistry accessible to the average organic chemist. Three years after the partnership began, the ElectraSyn was presented at the American Chemical Society annual meeting. In the seven years since, the ElectraSyn and subsequent ElectraSyn 2.0 have been adopted by the synthetic community and utilized towards hundreds of research articles and patents.

== Baran strategies for synthesis ==
=== 1. Ideality ===
In June 2010, Baran authored a paper describing the "Ideal Synthesis" in which he presents a simple and informative definition of "ideality" when comparing molecular syntheses. Building off of ideas discussed by James B. Hendrickson in 1975, "ideality" refers to the concept of making molecules in a way that minimizes concession steps (e.g. adding/removing protecting groups) and maximizes construction steps (i.e. C-C or C-heteroatom bond forming and strategic redox steps). Importantly, this conversation of synthetic ideality is limited to comparisons of syntheses of the same molecule.

=== 2. Two-Phase Synthesis ===
A systematic approach to the synthesis of terpenes was developed and executed in the context of numerous natural products, paralleling natural product formation. By rapidly building up a carbon skeleton followed by oxygenation, shorter synthesis routes are achieved, as exemplified with several Baran syntheses (including 14-Step Synthesis of (+)-Ingenolfrom (+)-3-Carene, Two-Phase Synthesis of (−)-Taxuyunnanine, Two-Phase Synthesis of Taxol, Development of a Concise Synthesis of (-)-Ingenol, among others)

=== 3. Radical Retrosynthesis ===
Radical retrosynthesis adds to the toolbox of synthetic planning by additionally considering intuitive radical disconnections and cross-coupling molecular partners. As methods develop towards more 1e- thinking, this strategic and tactical approach to synthesis will continue to aid in the construction of interesting and valuable natural products and medicinally important compounds. Radical retrosynthesis maximizes convergency by making disconnections that are not wedded to traditional polar bond analysis. The most useful methods from a tactical standpoint in this regard use radical cross coupling.

=== 4. Practical & Scalable Syntheses ===
Implicit in aiming for the ideal synthesis is being able to access useful quantities of a molecule by simple, scalable routes.

== Total syntheses ==
- (−)-Bipinnatin J (2025)
- (+)-Saxitoxin (2025)
- Dragocins A−C (2024)
- Dynobactin A (2024)
- (−)-Cyclopamine (2023)
- (+)-KB343 (2023)
- Portimine A and B (2023)
- Kibdelomycin (2022)
- Darobactin A (2022)
- (+)-Calcipotriol (2022)
- Tagetitoxin (2020)
- (–)-Maximiscin (2020)
- Taxol (2020)
- Teleocidins B-1-B-4 (2019)
- Herqulines B and C (2019)
- Subglutinols A & B (2018)
- Higginsianin A (2018)
- Sesquicillin A (2018)
- (–)-Thapsigargin (2017)
- Arylomycin A-C16 (2017)
- Ariaosamines (2016)
- (–)-Maoecrystal V (2016)
- Pallambins C and D (2016)
- (+)-Phorbol (2016)
- Verruculogen (2015)
- Fumitremorgin A (2015)
- Ouabagenin (2013, 2015)
- (−)-Hapalindole U (2015)
- (+)-Ambiguine H (2015)
- Tomentogenin (2015)
- Pergularin (2015)
- Utendin (2015)
- Dixiamycin B (2014)
- (+)-Ingenol (2014)
- (–)-Taxuyunnanine (2014)
- Dictazole A (2014)
- (−)-methyl atisenoate (2014)
- (−)-isoatisine (2014)
- (+)-Hongoquercin A (2013)
- (+)-Hongoquercin A (2013)
- Phellodonin (2013)
- Sarcodonin (2013)
- Pipercyclobutanamide A (2012)
- (+)-Taxadienone (2011)
- (+)-Psychotetramine (2011)
- Piperarborenine B &D (2011)
- (–)-Palau'amine (2010)
- Dihydrojunenol (2010)
- Vinigrol (2009)
- Kapakahines B and F (2009)
- (±)-Massadine (2008)
- (±)-Psychotrimine (2008)
- Cortistatin A (2008)
- (–)-Axinellamine A and B (2008)
- (±)-Chartelline C (2006)
- (−)-Bursehernin (2006)
- Haouamine A (2006)
- Avrainvillamide (2005)
- Stephacidin A & B (2005)
- (S)-Ketorolac (2005)
- (+)-hapalindole Q (2004)
- (−)-12-epi-fischerindole U isothiocyanate (2004)
- Sceptrin (2004)

== Methods towards synthesis ==
=== C-H Functionalization ===
- Radical-mediated C-H functionalization (alcohols to 1,3-diols) (2008)
- Chemoselective N-tert-Prenylation of Indoles by C–H Functionalization (2009)
- C-H trifluoromethylation of heterocylces (2011)
- Cyclobutane C–H arylation (2011)
- C–H amination of unactivated sp^{3} carbons (2012)
- C–H functionalization of heterocycles via Zn sulphinate salts (2012)
- C–H Imidation of (Hetero)Arenes (2013)
- C–H functionalization by sulfinate-derived radicals (2013)
- C–H Trifluoromethylcyclopropanation via sulfinate reagents(2013)
- Ligand-Controlled C-H Borylation (2015)
- Stereocontrolled Cβ–H/Cα–C Activation of Alkyl Carboxylic Acids (2019)
- Methylation of heteroarenes (2014)
- Bioconjugation by Native Chemical Tagging of C–H Bonds
- Direct Synthesis of Fluorinated Heteroarylether Bioisosteres (2013)

=== Olefin Functionalization ===
- Direct coupling of unactivated olefins to electron-deficient olefins (2013)
- Olefin functionalization via qunione diazides (2014)
- Olefin Hydroamination with nitroarenes (2015)
- Hydromethylation of Unactivated Olefins (2015)
- Anomeric Nitroamide Enabled, Cobalt Catalyzed Alkene Hydronitration

=== Radical Chemistry ===
- General Redox-Neutral Platform for Radical Cross-Coupling (2024)
- Practical Radical cyclization with Arylboronic Acids and Trifluoroborates (2011)
- Fe-Catalyzed C–C Bond Construction from Olefins via Radicals
- Sulfone enabled, radical cross-coupling resulting sp3-rich (fluoro)alkylated scaffolds (2018)
- General Amino Acid Synthesis Enabled by Innate Radical Cross-Coupling (2018)
- Ni-catalyzed/Ag-nanoparticle-modified electrodes for C–C sp^{2}–sp^{3} bond formation

=== Decarboxylative Coupling ===
- Decarboxylative Borylation (2017)
- Decarboxylative Alkenylation (2017)
- Decarboxylative Alkynylation (2017)
- Cu-Catalyzed Decarboxylative Borylation (2018)
- Ni-Electrocatalytic Decarboxylative Arylation to Access Quaternary Centers (2023)
- Ni-Catalyzed Enantioselective Decarboxylative Acylation (2023)
- Stereocontrolled Radical Thiophosphorylation (2023)
- Carbon Quaternization of RAEs and Olefins by Decarboxylative Coupling (2023)
- Functionalized Olefin Cross-Coupling to Construct Carbon-Carbon Bonds
- C–C cross-coupling of heteroatom-substituted olefins with e-deficient olefins
- Ni-Catalyzed Aryl-Alkyl Cross-Coupling of 2° RAEs (2016)
- Alkyl-Alkyl Cross-Coupling Enabled by RAEs and Alkylzinc Reagents (2016)
- Ni-catalyzed cross-coupling of RAEs with Boronic Acids (2016)
- Fe-catalyzed cross-coupling of RAEs (2016)
- Ni-Catalyzed Enantioselective Dialkyl Carbinol Synthesis via Decarboxylative Cross-Coupling (2022)
- Direct Carbon Isotope Exchange Through Decarboxylative Carboxylation (2019)

=== Simplifying Oligonucleotide Synthesis ===
- P(V) reagents: chiral phosphorothioate synthesis (2018)
- (+/-)-PI Reagent for the synthesis of P-Chiral Phosphines and Methyl-phosphonate oligonucleotides (2020)
- P(V)-Platform for Oligonucleotide Synthesis (2021)
- (+/-)-PSI Reagent for Enantioselective Synthesis of Thiophosphates (2021)
- Mild and Chemoselective Phorsphorylation of Alcohols Using a Ψ-Reagent (2021)
- Stereocontrolled Access to Thioisosteres of Nucleoside Di- and Triphosphates (2023)

=== Simplifying Peptide Synthesis ===
- CITU—reagent for peptide synthesis and decarboxylative cross-coupling (2017)
- Thermodynamic peptide macrocyclization (2017)
- General method for chemoselective, and modular functionalization of serine residues (2020)

=== Halogenation ===
- Direct difluoromethylation via Zn(SO_{2}CF_{2}H)_{2}
- N–X Anomeric Amides as Electrophilic Halogenation Reagents (2023)
- Guanidine-based chlorinating reagent, CBMG or "Palau'chlor" (2014)
- Regioselective bromination of N-oxides (2013)

=== Strain Release ===
- Strain-release amination (2016)
- Stereospecific strain-release cyclopentylation of amines, alcohols, thiols, carboxylic acids, and other heteroatoms (2017)
- Enantiocontrolled Azetidine Library Synthesis via Strain Release Functionalization of 1-Azabicyclobutanes (2024)

=== Electrochemical methods ===
- Allylic C–H oxidation
- Electrochemical Oxidation of Unactivated C–H Bonds
- Electrochemical Ni-catalyzed amination
- Reductive electrosynthesis (electrochemical Birch reduction)
- Electrochemically Driven, Ni-Catalyzed Aryl Amination
- Electrochemical C(sp3)-H Fluorination
- Electrochemically Driven Desaturation of Carbonyl Compounds
- Electrochemical Cyclobutane Synthesis in Flow
- Electrochemical Decarboxylative N‑Alkylation of Heterocycles
- Electroreductive Olefin-Ketone Coupling
- Electrochemical Borylation of Carboxylic Acids
- Electrochemical Nozaki–Hiyama–Kishi Coupling
- Chemoselective Electrosynthesis via rapid alternating polarity (rAP)
- Co-Electrocatalytic H.A.T. for Functionalization of Unsaturated C-C Bonds
- Ni-Electrocatalytic C(sp3)–C(sp3) Doubly Decarboxylative Coupling
- Chemoselective, Metal-free, (Hetero)Arene Electroreduction Enabled by Rapid Alternating Polarity
- Decarboxylative Arylation via Ag-Ni Electrocatalysis
- Chemoselective Ni-Electrocatalytic Sulfinylation of Aryl Halides
- Waveform-Controlled Electrosynthesis
- Electrocatalytic decarboxylative cross-coupling
- Ni-Electrocatalytic Enantioselective Doubly Decarboxylative C(sp3)–C(sp3) Cross Coupling
- N-Ammonium Ylide Mediators for Electrochemical C–H Oxidation
- Electrochemical Decarboxylative Olefination (w/ Alternating Polarity)
- Electroreductive Synthesis of Nickel(0) Complexes
- Electrocatalytic Asymmetric Nozaki–Hiyama–Kishi Decarboxylative Coupling
- Ni-electrocatalytic Modular Access to Enantiopure 1,2-Aminoalcohols decarboxylative arylation
- Ni-Electrocatalytic Cross-Coupling Access to Targeted Protein Degraders
- Ni/Ag-electrocatalytic Cross-Coupling Synthesis of Unnatural Amino Acids
- Enantio and chemoselective electrocatalytic radical Cross Coupling for aminoalcohol Synthesis
- Triply Convergent Ni-Electrocatalytic Assembly of 1,1-diaryl Cyclobutanes, Azetidines, and Oxetanes
- Hindered Dialkyl Ether Synthesis (2019)
- Chemoselective, Scalable Nickel-Electrocatalytic O-Arylation of Alcohols

=== Misc ===
- Direct Coupling of Indoles with Carbonyl Compounds (2004)
- One-Step Synthesis of 4,5-Disubstituted Pyrimidines (2006)
- Intermolecular Enolate Heterocoupling (2008)
- Direct arylation of indoles (2009)
- Direct arylation of e-deficient heterocyles (2010)
- Nickel-Promoted Diene/Alkyne Cooligomerization (2012)
- Synthesis of 1,2-difunctionalized bicyclo[1.1.1]pentanes (2020)
- Regioselective Synthesis of C4-Alkylated Pyridines (2021)

== Redox-Neutral Radical Cross-Coupling ==
In 2025, the Baran laboratory reported a general platform for "redox-neutral radical cross-coupling" employing sulfonyl hydrazides as stable, crystalline radical precursors.

These reagents, prepared from a variety of feedstocks (including alcohols, carbonyl compounds, amines, and hydrazines), function as dual-purpose agents: they generate alkyl radicals while donating electrons to activate the nickel catalyst. This eliminates the need for external redox additives, photoredox catalysts, electrochemical setups, or pyrophoric organometallic reagents. The reactions operate under Suzuki-like conditions—an inexpensive nickel catalyst, mild base, and gentle heating—with nitrogen gas as the sole byproduct.

The platform enables C–C bond-forming transformations with multiple partner classes, including activated olefins (Giese-type additions), alkyl halides, redox-active esters, (hetero)aryl halides, alkenyl halides, alkynyl halides, and trifluoromethylating reagents. These couplings forge C(sp³)–C(sp³), C(sp³)–C(sp²), and C(sp³)–C(sp) bonds and have been adopted in medicinal chemistry programs for the rapid assembly of complex, sp³-rich scaffolds and fragment libraries.

Later in 2025, the same sulfonyl hydrazide platform was extended to achieve stereospecific (stereoretentive) radical cross-couplings. Using readily accessible enantioenriched sulfonyl hydrazides and an achiral nickel catalyst, the method delivers high levels of stereoretention through an inner-sphere mechanism. This advance enables the enantioselective construction of three-dimensional, sp³-rich molecules used in drug discovery and total synthesis.

Sulfonyl hydrazides are commercially available as reagent feedstock.

== Reagents developed ==
- (+/-)-PI Reagent
- (+/-)-PSI Reagent
- CBMG or "Palau'chlor"
- CITU
- Zinc sulfinate salts
  - Zinc trifluoromethanesulfinate (TFMS), zinc difluoromethanesulfinate (DFMS), zinc trifluoroethanesulfinate (TFES), zinc monofluoromethanesulfinate (MFMS), zinc isopropylsulfinate (IPS), zinc triethyleneglycolsulfinate (TEGS)
- Sulfonyl hydrazides
- Listed reagents available through standard chemical suppliers

== Publications ==
Phil S. Baran has authored and co-authored approximately 300 research publications with an h-index of 133 and over 60,000 citations. His group's research has been published in journals including Science, Nature, Journal of American Chemical Society (JACS), Angewandte Chemie, and Journal of Organic Chemistry (JOC).

Baran has authored the digital interactive reference text The Portable Chemist's Consultant: A Survival Guide for Discovery, Process, and Radiolabeling and contributed chapters and forewords to several scientific publications.

== Awards and honors ==
- Highly Cited Researcher, yearly, 2014–2024
- Edison Patent Award, 2023
- Horizon Discovery Prize, Royal Society of Chemistry, 2022
- Danisco Science Excellence Medal Award, 2022
- Bristol Chemical Synthesis Syngenta Award, 2021
- Janssen Prize for Creativity, 2020
- Inhoffen Medal, 2019
- Manchot Research Professorship, 2017
- Member, The National Academy of Sciences, 2017
- Emanuel Merck Lectureship, 2017
- Mukaiyama Award, 2014
- MacArthur Fellowship, 2013
- Royal Society of Chemistry Synthetic Organic Chemistry Award, 2013
- ACS San Diego Section Distinguished Scientist Award, 2012
- ISHC Katritzky Heterocyclic Chemistry Award, 2011
- Thieme–IUPAC Prize in Synthetic Organic Chemistry, 2010
- ACS Award in Pure Chemistry, 2010
- Sackler Prize, 2009
- Novartis Lecturer, 2007–2008
- Hirata Gold Medal, 2007
- National Fresenius Award, 2007
- Pfizer Award for Creativity in Organic Chemistry, 2006
- Beckman Young Investigators Award, 2006
- Alfred P. Sloan Foundation Fellow, 2006–2008
- BMS Unrestricted "Freedom to Discover" Grant, 2006–2010
- NSF Career, 2006–2010
- Eli-Lilly Young Investigator Award, 2005–2006
- AstraZeneca Excellence in Chemistry Award, 2005
- DuPont Young Professor Award, 2005
- Roche Excellence in Chemistry Award, 2005
- Amgen Young Investigator Award, 2005
- Searle Scholar Award, 2005
- GlaxoSmithKline Chemistry Scholar Award, 2005–2006
- Nobel Laureate Signature Award for Graduate Education in Chemistry, ACS, 2003
- National Institutes of Health Post-Doctoral Fellowship Award, Harvard, 2001–2003
- Hoffmann-La Roche Award for Excellence in Organic Chemistry, 2000
- Lesly Starr Shelton Award for Excellence in Chemistry Graduate Studies, 2000
- National Science Foundation Pre-Doctoral Fellowship Award, Scripps, 1998–2001
