= Aurantiamine =

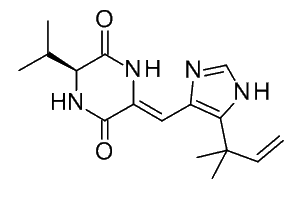

Names
- Preferred IUPAC name (3Z,6S)-3-{[5-(2-Methylbut-3-en-2-yl)-1H-imidazol-4-yl]methylidene}-6-(propan-2-yl)piperazine-2,5-dione

Identifiers
CAS Number	143085-86-3
3D model (JSmol)	Interactive image
ChEMBL	ChEMBL4211882
ChemSpider	9533478
PubChem CID	11358551
CompTox Dashboard (EPA)	DTXSID901045460
- InChI: InChI=1S/C16H22N4O2/c1-6-16(4,5)13-10(17-8-18-13)7-11-14(21)20-12(9(2)3)15(22)19-11/h6-9,12H,1H2,2-5H3,(H,17,18)(H,19,22)(H,20,21)/b11-7-/t12-/m0/s1 Key: RSGRSUVVCYUKLM-RDQDRAATSA-N; InChI=1/C16H22N4O2/c1-6-16(4,5)13-10(17-8-18-13)7-11-14(21)20-12(9(2)3)15(22)19-11/h6-9,12H,1H2,2-5H3,(H,17,18)(H,19,22)(H,20,21)/b11-7-/t12-/m0/s1 Key: RSGRSUVVCYUKLM-RDQDRAATBK
- SMILES: CC(C)[C@H]1C(=O)N/C(=C\C2=C(NC=N2)C(C)(C)C=C)/C(=O)N1

Properties
Chemical formula	C_{16}H_{22}N_{4}O_{2}
Molar mass	302.378 g·mol^{−1}
- Except where otherwise noted, data are given for materials in their standard state (at 25 °C [77 °F], 100 kPa). Infobox references

(−)-Aurantiamine is a blue fluorescence metabolite produced by the fungus Penicillium aurantiogriseum, a fungus common in stored cereals. (−)-Aurantiamine belongs to a class of naturally occurring 2,5-diketopiperazines featuring a dehydrohistidine residue that exhibit important biological activities, such as anti-cancer or neurotoxic effects. It is the isopropyl analog of the microtubule binding agent (−)-phenylahistin but is 40 times less active than the latter on P388 cell proliferation. The total asymmetric synthesis of (−)-aurantiamine has been described.
