= Cyclodipeptide oxidase =

Class of enzymes

Albonoursin synthase

Identifiers
- Organism: Streptomyces noursei
- Symbol: albA
- Orthologs: OMA: entry
- PDB: 8UC3
- UniProt: Q8GED9

Other data
- EC number: 1.3.3.13
Search for
- Structures: Swiss-model
- Domains: InterPro

Cyclodipeptide oxidases (CDOs) also known as albonoursin synthase are a class of flavoproteins and filament-forming enzymes, which are involved in the biosynthesis of 2,5-diketopiperazines (2,5-DKPs). While cyclodipeptide synthases (CDPSs) catalyze the first steps of the 2,5-DKP pathway using aminoacyl-tRNAs, CDOs catalyze the oxidation of the resulting Cα-Cβ bonds of the product. CDOs thus introduce an α,β-dehydroamino acid residue into the DKP ring system, changing its geometry and increasing its conjugation. CDOs perform a second oxidation step to yield albonoursin as a final product.
