= Brevianamide =

- Brevianamide A

- Brevianamide B

Names
- IUPAC names Brevianamide A: (2′R,5aR,8aS,9aR)-8,8-Dimethyl-2,3,8a,9-tetrahydrospiro[5a,9a-(epiminomethano)cyclopenta[f]indolizine-7,2'-indoline]-3',5,10(1H,6H,8H)-trione; Brevianamide B: (2′S,5aR,8aS,9aR)-8,8-Dimethyl-2,3,8a,9-tetrahydrospiro[5a,9a-(epiminomethano)cyclopenta[f]indolizine-7,2'-indoline]-3',5,10(1H,6H,8H)-trione
- Other names Brevianamid A; Brevianamid B

Identifiers
CAS Number	(Brevianamid A): 23402-09-7; (Brevianamid B): 38136-92-4
3D model (JSmol)	(Brevianamid A): Interactive image; (Brevianamid B): Interactive image
ChEBI	(Brevianamid B): CHEBI:200715
ChemSpider	(Brevianamid A): 21447237; (Brevianamid B): 21447236
PubChem CID	(Brevianamid A): 25163935; (Brevianamid B): 99771
UNII	(Brevianamid A): L2S5E3NBIH; (Brevianamid B): RTJ0M35T4U
- InChI: (Brevianamid A): InChI=1S/C21H23N3O3/c1-18(2)14-10-19-8-5-9-24(19)17(27)20(14,23-16(19)26)11-21(18)15(25)12-6-3-4-7-13(12)22-21/h3-4,6-7,14,22H,5,8-11H2,1-2H3,(H,23,26)/t14-,19+,20+,21-/m0/s1 Key: MWOFPQAPILIIPR-DJJZHVJBSA-N; (Brevianamid B): InChI=1S/C21H23N3O3/c1-18(2)14-10-19-8-5-9-24(19)17(27)20(14,23-16(19)26)11-21(18)15(25)12-6-3-4-7-13(12)22-21/h3-4,6-7,14,22H,5,8-11H2,1-2H3,(H,23,26) Key: MWOFPQAPILIIPR-UHFFFAOYSA-N
- SMILES: (Brevianamid A): O=C1[C@@]2(NC3=O)C[C@@]4(C(C)(C)[C@]2([H])C[C@]53N1CCC5)C(C6=CC=CC=C6N4)=O; (Brevianamid B): O=C1[C@@]2(NC3=O)C[C@]4(C(C)(C)[C@]2([H])C[C@]53N1CCC5)C(C6=CC=CC=C6N4)=O

Properties
Chemical formula	C_{21}H_{23}N_{3}O_{3}
Molar mass	365.433 g·mol^{−1}
- Except where otherwise noted, data are given for materials in their standard state (at 25 °C [77 °F], 100 kPa). verify (what is ?) Infobox references

Brevianamides are indole alkaloids that belong to a class of naturally occurring 2,5-diketopiperazines produced as secondary metabolites of fungi in the genus Penicillium and Aspergillus. Structurally similar to paraherquamides, they are a small class compounds that contain a bicyclo[2.2.2]diazoctane ring system. One of the major secondary metabolites in Penicillium spores, they are responsible for inflammatory response in lung cells.

== History ==
Originally isolated from Pennicillum compactum in 1969, brevianamide A has shown insecticidal activity. Further studies showed that a minor secondary metabolite, brevianamide B, has an epimeric center at the spiro-indoxyl quaternary center. Both were found to fluoresce under long-wave ultraviolet radiation. Furthermore, under irradaton, brevianamide A has been shown to isomerize to brevianamide B.

== Biosynthesis ==
While the biosynthesis has not been conclusively elucidated, brevianamide A and B are constructed from tryptophan, proline, and an isoprene unit.

== Total synthesis ==
The total synthesis of several brevianamides have been reported, for brevianamide-B and for brevianamide-E.

== Biological activity ==
Tests for antibiotic effectiveness against E. coli, A. fecalis, B. subtilis, S. aureus, and P. aeruginosa were negative. Also, no inhibitory action was shown against A. niger, A. flavis, P. crustosum, F. graminearum, F. moniliforme, Alternara sp., and Cladosporium sp. However, some insecticidal activity has been shown in one study, possibly showing some use as an insecticide for food crops. In mammalian (mice lung cell) studies, brevianamide A has shown to induce cytotoxicity in cells. Furthermore, ELISA assays showed elevated levels of tumor necrosis factor-alpha (TNF-A), macrophage inflammatory protein-2 (MIP-2), and interleukin 6 (IL-6). Therefore, brevianamide A may not be a suitable insecticide in food crops.

== See also ==
- Brevianamide F
