= RpoB =

DNA-directed RNA polymerase subunit beta

Identifiers
- Organism: Escherichia coli
- Symbol: rpoB
- Entrez: 948488
- Orthologs: NCBI: entry; OMA: entry
- PDB: 3IYD
- RefSeq (Prot): NP_418414.1
- UniProt: P0A8V2

Other data
- EC number: 2.7.7.6
- Chromosome: genomic: 4.18 - 4.19 Mb
Search for
- Structures: Swiss-model
- Domains: InterPro

The rpoB gene encodes the β subunit of bacterial RNA polymerase and the homologous plastid-encoded RNA polymerase (PEP). It codes for 1342 amino acids in E. coli, making it the second-largest polypeptide in the bacterial cell. It is targeted by the rifamycin family of antibacterials, such as rifampin. Mutations in rpoB that confer resistance to rifamycins do so by altering the protein's drug-binding residues, thereby reducing affinity for these antibiotics.

Some bacteria contain multiple copies of the 16S rRNA gene, which is commonly used as the molecular marker to study phylogeny. In these cases, the single-copy rpoB gene can be used to study microbial diversity.

An inhibitor of transcription in bacteria, tagetitoxin, also inhibits PEP, showing that the complex found in plants is very similar to the homologous enzyme in bacteria.

== Drug resistance ==
In a bacterium without the proper mutation(s) in rpoB rifampicin binds to a site near the fork in the β subunit and prevents the polymerase from transcribing more than two or three base pairs of any RNA sequence and stopping production of proteins within the cell. Bacteria with mutations in the proper loci along the rpoB gene are resistant to this effect.

Initial studies were done by Jin and Gross to generate rpoB mutations in E. coli that conferred resistance to rifampicin. Three clusters of mutations were identified, cluster I at codons 507-533, cluster II at codons 563-572, and cluster III at codon 687. The majority of these mutations are located within an 81 base pair(bp) region in cluster I dubbed the "Rifampicin Resistance Determining Region (RRDR)". This resistance is typically associated with a mutation wherein a base in the DNA is substituted for another one and the new sequence codes for an amino acid with a large side chain that inhibits the rifampicin molecules from binding to the polymerase.

There are additional mutations which can occur in the β subunit of the polymerase which are located away from the rifampicin binding site that can also result in mild resistance. Potentially indicating that the shape of these areas may affect the formation of the rifampicin binding site.

Nucleic acid probes can detect mutations in rpoB that confer rifampicin resistance. For Mycobacterium tuberculosis, the rifamycin-resistant mutations most commonly encountered involve codons 516, 526, and 531 (numbered, by convention, as in Escherichia coli rpoB). These mutations result in high rifampicin resistance with a relatively low loss of fitness. For Staphylococcus aureus, the rifamycin-resistant mutation most commonly encountered involves codon 526.

In addition to imparting resistance to rifampicin, certain rpoB mutations have been identified in 70% of Vancomycin Intermediate S. aureus (VISA) strains.

== Physiological Effects of rpoB Mutations ==
The regions of the rpoB gene which are susceptible to mutations are typically well conserved, indicating they are important for life. This makes it very likely that mutations within these regions have some effect on the overall fitness of the organism. These physiological changes can include a reduced rate of growth, increased sensitivity to increases or decreases in temperature, and alterations to the properties of RNA chain elongation and transcription termination. Such changes are not universal across all bacteria, though. A mutation in codon 450 of M. tuberculosis leads to a minor loss of fitness, while the corresponding mutation in S. aureus results in bacteria barely able to survive.

In Neisseria meningitidis rpoB mutations have been observed to increase expression of enzymes which are involved in metabolizing carbohydrates, as well as enzymes involved in the citric acid cycle and in transcription elongation. At the same time enzymes involved in ATP production, cell division, and lipid metabolism are all downregulated, or expressed at a lower than normal level.

In M. tuberculosis mutations in the rpoB gene can significantly upregulate polyketide synthase, potentially indicating increased production of phthiocerol dimycocerosate, a lipid produced by M. tuberculosis and implicated in virulence of the bacteria. Mutations also impact promoter binding, elongation, termination, and transcription-coupled repair processes in the RNA polymerase itself. Because of this, rpoB mutations were used to study transcription mechanisms before interest shifted to their ability to impart antibiotic resistance. Particular mutations can even result in strains of M. tuberculosis which grow better in the presence of rifampicin than they do when the antibiotic is not present.

In bacteria which are used to produce naturally occurring antibiotics such as erythromycin (Saccharopolyspora erythraea) and vancomycin (Amycolatopsis orientalis) certain rpoB mutations can increase the production of antibiotic by bacteria with those mutations.
