= ABCG2 =

Protein-coding gene in the species Homo sapiens

Identifiers
- Aliases: ABCG2, ATP-binding cassette, sub-family G (WHITE), member 2 (Junior blood group), ABC15, ABCP, BCRP, BCRP1, BMDP, CD338, CDw338, EST157481, GOUT1, MRX, MXR, MXR1, UAQTL1, MXR-1, ATP binding cassette subfamily G member 2 (Junior blood group)
- External IDs: OMIM: 603756; MGI: 1347061; GeneCards: ABCG2
Enzyme activity
EC #	BRENDA	ExPASy	KEGG	MetaCyc
7.6.2.2	↗	↗	↗	↗

Gene location (Human)
Chr.	Chromosome 4 (human)
Band	4q22.1	Start	88,090,150 bp
Band	4q22.1	End	88,231,628 bp

Gene location (Mouse)
Chr.	Chromosome 6 (mouse)
Band	6 B3|6 27.82 cM	Start	58,561,508 bp
Band	6 B3|6 27.82 cM	End	58,672,661 bp
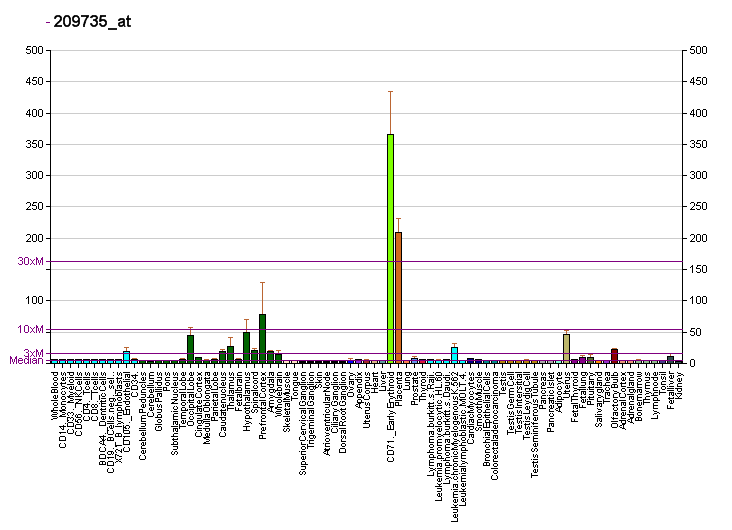
RNA expression pattern
Bgee	Human / Mouse (ortholog); Top expressed in: jejunal mucosa; mucosa of ileum; endothelial cell; mucosa of transverse colon; seminal vesicula; duodenum; substantia nigra; internal globus pallidus; placenta; C1 segment / Top expressed in: right kidney; proximal tubule; human kidney; ileum; fetal liver hematopoietic progenitor cell; yolk sac; jejunum; tail of embryo; sciatic nerve; human fetus; More reference expression data
BioGPS	More reference expression data
Gene ontology
Molecular function	nucleotide binding; ABC-type xenobiotic transporter activity; heme transmembrane transporter activity; protein homodimerization activity; transporter activity; ATPase activity; protein binding; ATP binding; ATPase-coupled transmembrane transporter activity; cholesterol transfer activity; identical protein binding; xenobiotic transmembrane transporter activity
Cellular component	mitochondrial membranes; membrane; mitochondrion; nucleus; plasma membrane; integral component of membrane; apical plasma membrane; receptor complex
Biological process	urate metabolic process; cellular iron ion homeostasis; heme transport; xenobiotic transmembrane transport; xenobiotic transport; transmembrane transport; cholesterol efflux; cellular detoxification
Sources:Amigo / QuickGO
Orthologs
Databases	NCBI: entry; OMA: entry
Species	Human	Mouse
Entrez	9429	26357
Ensembl	ENSG00000118777	ENSMUSG00000029802
UniProt	Q9UNQ0	Q7TMS5
RefSeq (mRNA)	NM_001257386; NM_004827; NM_001348985; NM_001348986; NM_001348987 NM_001348988; NM_001348989	NM_011920; NM_001355477; NM_001381925; NM_001381926; NM_001381927
RefSeq (protein)	NP_001244315; NP_004818; NP_001335914; NP_001335915; NP_001335916 NP_001335917; NP_001335918	NP_036050; NP_001342406; NP_001368854; NP_001368855; NP_001368856
Location (UCSC)	Chr 4: 88.09 – 88.23 Mb	Chr 6: 58.56 – 58.67 Mb
PubMed search
- Wikidata
View/Edit Human	View/Edit Mouse

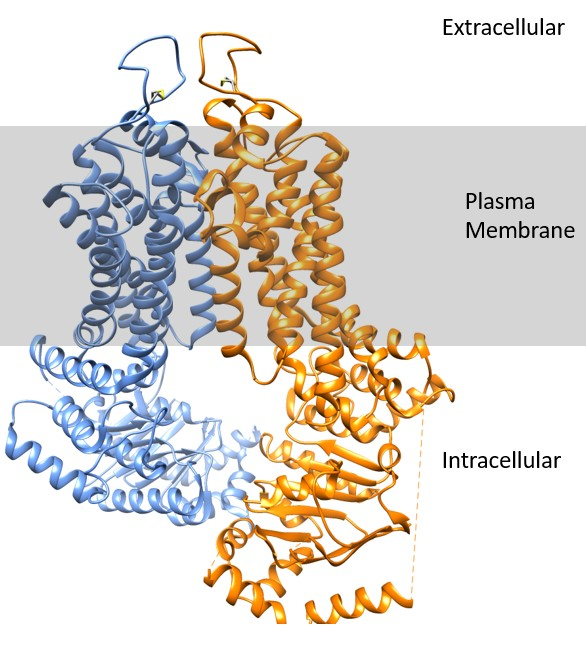
ABCG2 with simulated plasma membrane

ATP-binding cassette subfamily G member 2 is a protein that in humans is encoded by the ABCG2 gene. ABCG2 has also been designated as CDw338 (cluster of differentiation w338). ABCG2 is a translocation protein used to actively pump drugs and other compounds against their concentration gradient using the bonding and hydrolysis of ATP as the energy source.

ABCG2 forms into a homodimer to assume its active transport conformation. The dimer weighs approximately 144 kDa. The expression of this transport protein is highly conserved throughout the animal kingdom, pointing to its importance.

Substrate binding with compounds occurs in the large central cavity. ABCG2 can bind to a broad range of compounds but binds strongest to flat, polycyclic chemicals with lots of hydrophobic character.

== Function ==
The membrane-associated protein encoded by this gene is included in the superfamily of ATP-binding cassette (ABC) transporters. ABC proteins transport various molecules across extra- and intra-cellular membranes. The active transport of chemicals requires a source of energy to catalyze the conformational changes the protein undergoes. The nucleotide-binding domains (NBDs) found towards the N-terminus allow binding to ATP molecules. The NBD and the transmembrane domain (TMD) are the most conserved region of the transporter in various animal groups, highlighting the importance of these regions for overall protein function. Additionally, many ABC transporters have conserved NBD regions showing the strict conformation needed to bind ATP molecules.

ABC genes are divided into seven distinct subfamilies (ABC1, MDR/TAP, MRP, ALD, OABP, GCN20, White). This protein is a member of the White subfamily, also known as subfamily G. Alternatively referred to as the breast cancer resistance protein (BCRP), this protein functions as a xenobiotic transporter which may play a role in multi-drug resistance to chemotherapeutic agents including mitoxantrone and camptothecin analogues. Early observations of significant ABCG2-mediated resistance to anthracyclines were subsequently attributed mutations encountered in vitro but not in nature or the clinic. Significant expression of this protein has been observed in the placenta, and it has been shown to have a role in protecting the fetus from xenobiotics in the maternal circulation.

The transporter has been shown to play protective roles in blocking absorption at the apical membrane of the intestine, and at the blood–testis barrier, the blood–brain barrier, and the membranes of hematopoietic progenitor and other stem cells. At the apical membranes of the liver and kidney, it enhances excretion of xenobiotics. In the lactating mammary gland, it has a role on excreting vitamins such as riboflavin and biotin into milk. Xenobiotic toxins compete for the substrate binding domain of ABCG2 potentially causing toxins to concentrate in the breast milk. In the kidney and gastrointestinal tract, it has a role in urate excretion.

The protein also carries the Jr(a) antigen, which defines the Junior blood group system.

== Interactive pathway map ==
Click on genes, proteins and metabolites below to link to respective articles. (Note: The interactive pathway map can be edited at WikiPathways: "FluoropyrimidineActivity_WP1601".)
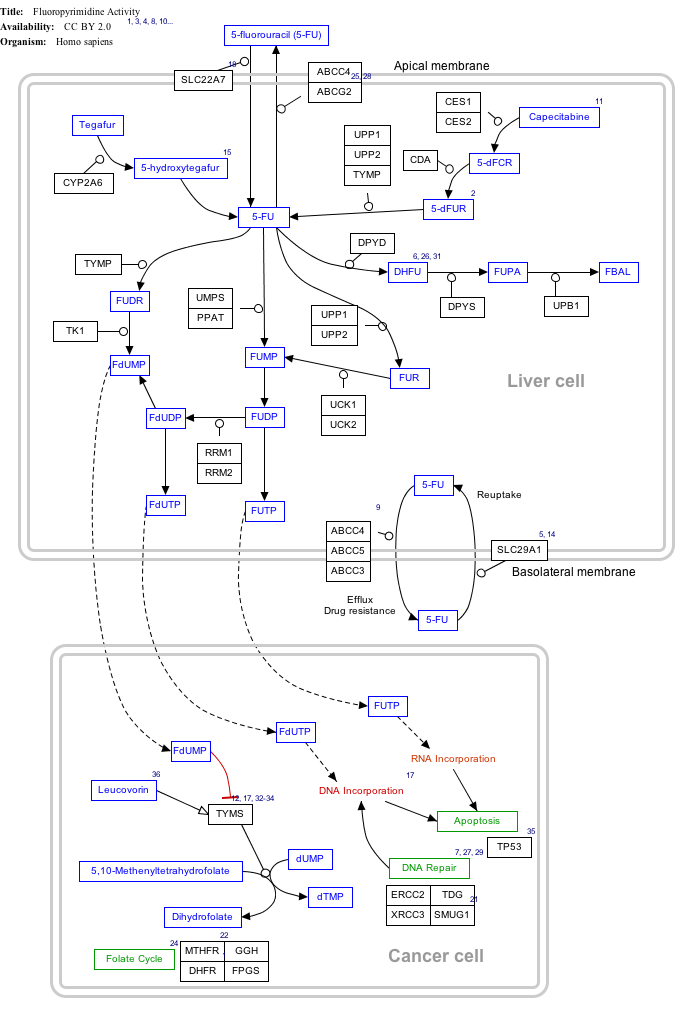

Fluorouracil (5-FU) Activity edit
Click on genes, proteins and metabolites below to link to respective articles. (Note: The interactive pathway map can be edited at WikiPathways: "IrinotecanPathway_WP229".)
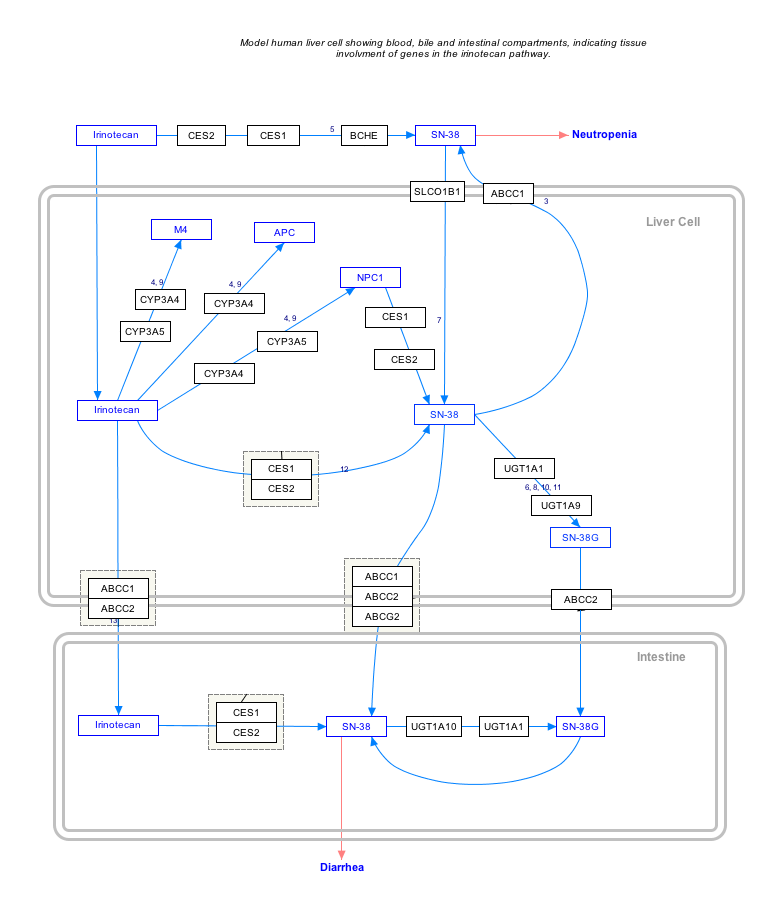

Irinotecan Pathway edit

== Inhibition ==
It is inhibited by some calcium channel blockers such as amlodipine, felodipine and nifedipine. The fungal toxin fumitremorgin C (FTC) inhibits the protein but has neurotoxic side effects. A synthetic tetracyclic analog of FTC called Ko-143 inhibits ABCG2.

== See also ==
- ATP-binding cassette transporter
