= Drimentine G =

Drimentine G and its biosynthesis

Names
- IUPAC name (1S,4S,7S,9S)-9-[[(1S,4aS,8aS)-5,5,8a-trimethyl-2-methylidene-3,4,4a,6,7,8-hexahydro-1H-naphthalen-1-yl]methyl]-4-propan-2-yl-2,5,16-triazatetracyclo[7.7.0.0^{2,7}.0^{10,15}]hexadeca-10,12,14-triene-3,6-dione

Identifiers
3D model (JSmol)	Interactive image
ChEBI	CHEBI:212160
ChemSpider	35003397
PubChem CID	60166415
- InChI: InChI=1S/C31H43N3O2/c1-18(2)25-27(36)34-23(26(35)33-25)17-31(20-10-7-8-11-22(20)32-28(31)34)16-21-19(3)12-13-24-29(4,5)14-9-15-30(21,24)6/h7-8,10-11,18,21,23-25,28,32H,3,9,12-17H2,1-2,4-6H3,(H,33,35)/t21-,23-,24-,25-,28-,30+,31-/m0/s1 Key: BXHPPYWSGQKUIJ-RJBXWAARSA-N
- SMILES: CC(C)[C@H]1C(=O)N2[C@@H](C[C@@]3([C@H]2NC4=CC=CC=C43)C[C@H]5C(=C)CC[C@@H]6[C@@]5(CCCC6(C)C)C)C(=O)N1

Properties
Chemical formula	C_{31}H_{43}N_{3}O_{2}
Molar mass	489.704 g·mol^{−1}
- Except where otherwise noted, data are given for materials in their standard state (at 25 °C [77 °F], 100 kPa). Infobox references

Drimentine G (DMT G) belongs to the family of drimentines, which are terpenylated diketopiperazines. DMT G contains two different parts, one comes from the non-ribosomal peptide synthetase (NRPS) pathway to generate the diketopiperazine ring structure. The other part comes from either the mevalonic acid pathway (MVA) or deoxy xylulose phosphate pathway (MEP) to produce sesquiterpenes needed for interaction with the diketopiperazine. This molecule is said to be useful as an antibiotic to treat bacterial or fungi infections, has therapeutic application to treat animal health, and can serve as a pest control for plants.

== Natural occurrence ==
Drimentines can be isolated from soil-born microorganisms, known as Actinomycetes. This type of microorganism comes from under Acacia trees found in Australia.

== Biosynthesis ==
The biosynthetic pathway for DMT G can be broken down into two different parts, with first part leads to formation of two starting materials and the second part in which those two materials can join and undergo a series of cyclization reactions. In the first part, one of the starting materials is diketopiperazine of specific two amino acids, known as tryptophan and valine. They will first be attached to tRNA using specific tRNA synthase, and then can interact with each other forming diketopiperazine with the help of dmtB1, which is one of the cyclodipeptide synthases (CDPSs) responsible for the formation of two successive peptide bonds. The other starting material is farnesyl pyrophosphate (FPP), which is produced from reaction between two isopentenyl pyrophosphate (IPP) and its isomer dimethylallyl pyrophosphate (DMAPP) with the help of FPP synthase. These IPP and DMAPP starter units come from either MVA or MEP pathway. After the starting materials have been produced, they can be joined and kick out pyrophosphate as a leaving group with the help of a phytoene-synthase-like family prenyltransferase DmtC1. Then, a series of cyclization reaction occurs, with the diketopiperazine forming ring with tryptophan using DmtC1 as enzyme and the ring forming of FPP with the help of a membrane terpene cyclase DmtA1. Thus, the final product of DMT G has been produced.

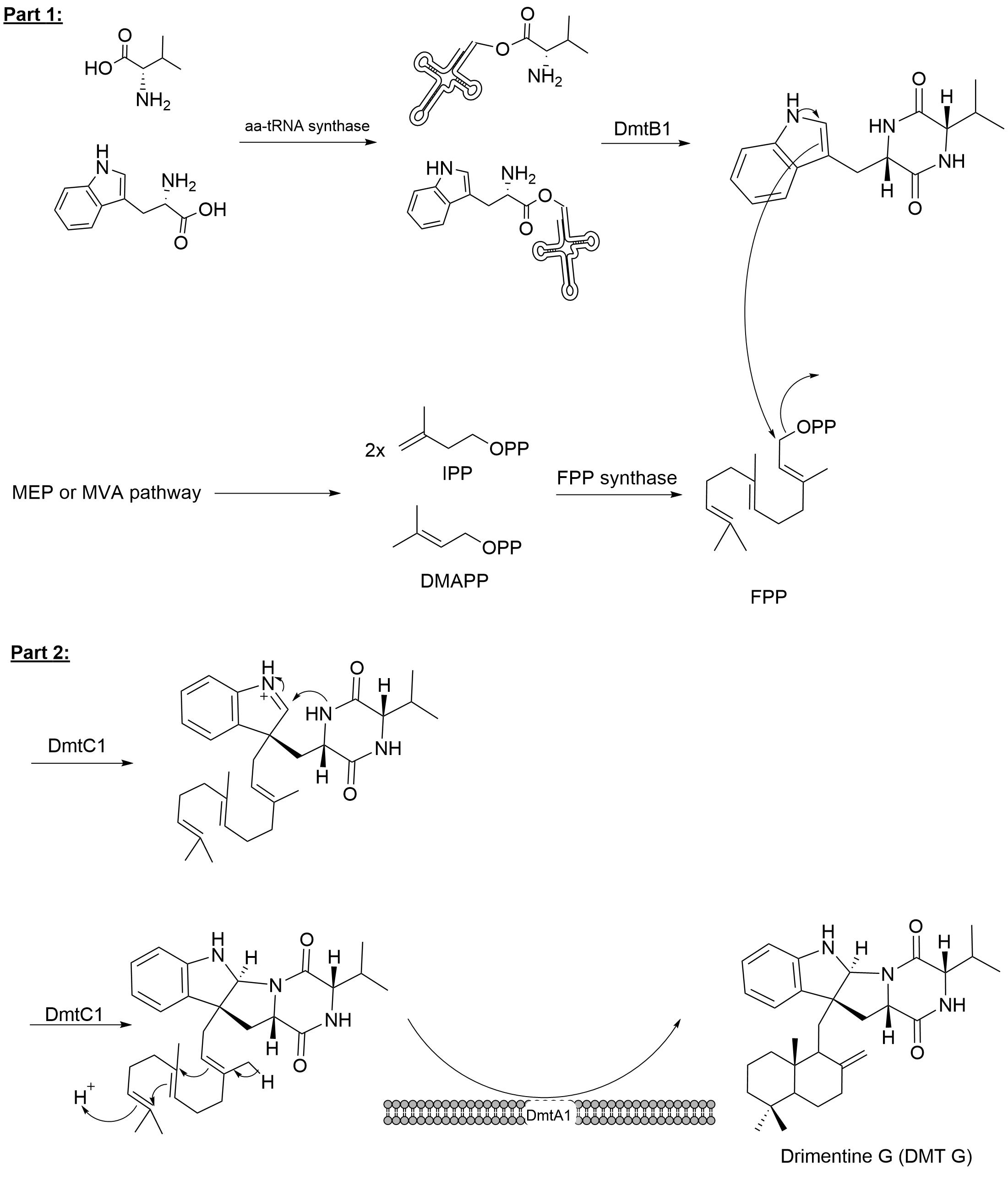

== Other drimentines ==
There are many other drimentines outside of DMT G, some of which have synthetic pathways already discovered. In the image, four other drimentines are presented known as drimentine A (DMT A), drimentine C (DMT C), drimentine F (DMT F), and drimentine B (DMT B).

Drimentine A has similar structure to that of DMT G with only different part in the diketopiperazine ring forming between leucine and tryptophan. It also has similar synthetic pathway with difference only in the condition of the reactions.

Drimentine F is similar to DMT G with difference in a methylated amine in the diketopiperazine ring. The incorporation and roles of different enzymes involved in the methylation process has been studied extensively. Drimentine C and B have similar structure with an additional double bond in DMT B in comparison to DMT C. Three approaches have been studied and researched more extensively for the production of DMT C utilizing metal palladium

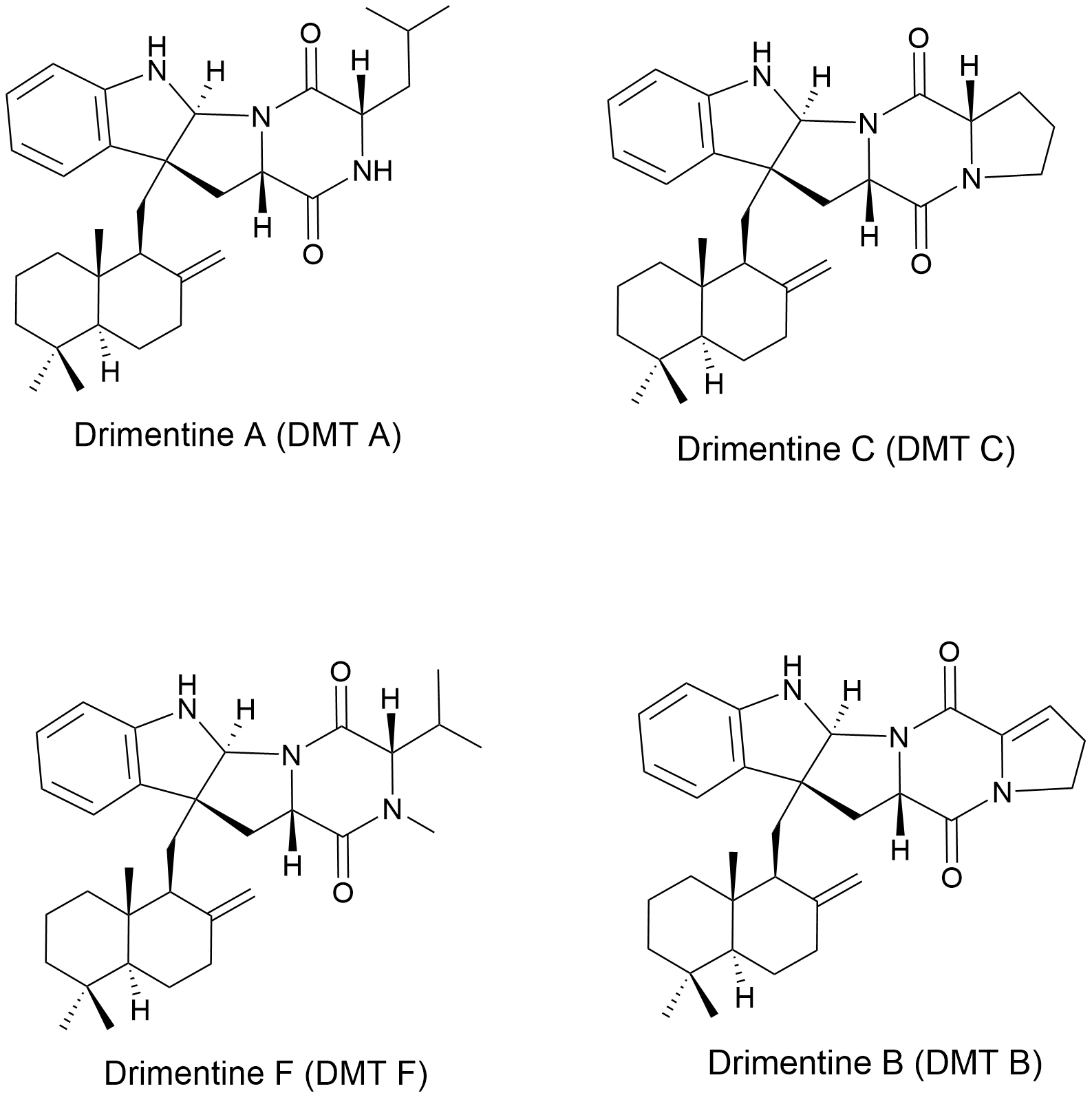
