= C16H17N3O2 =

The molecular formula C_{16}H_{17}N_{3}O_{2} (molar mass: 283.331 g/mol) may refer to:

- Amonafide
- Brevianamide F, or cyclo-(L-Trp-L-Pro)
