= C22H25N3O4 =

The molecular formula C_{22}H_{25}N_{3}O_{4} (molar mass: 395.452 g/mol, exact mass: 395.1845 u) may refer to:

- Abanoquil
- Spirotryprostatin A
- Vesnarinone
