= Penicillium raistrickii =

Scientific classification
- Domain: Eukaryota
- Kingdom: Fungi
- Division: Ascomycota
- Class: Eurotiomycetes
- Order: Eurotiales
- Family: Aspergillaceae
- Genus: Penicillium
- Species: P. raistrickii

Binomial name
- Penicillium raistrickii Smith, G. 1933

Type strain
- CBS 272.83, CECT 2735, IMI 255795, Quintanilla 1012

Synonyms
- Penicillium castellae

Species of fungus

Penicillium raistrickii is an anamorph species of fungus in the genus Penicillium which produces griseofulvin, patulin and verruculogen.
