= Penicillium estinogenum =

Scientific classification
- Kingdom: Fungi
- Division: Ascomycota
- Class: Eurotiomycetes
- Order: Eurotiales
- Family: Aspergillaceae
- Genus: Penicillium
- Species: P. estinogenum

Binomial name
- Penicillium estinogenum A. Komatsu & S. Abe ex G. Smith 1963

Type strain
- ATCC 18310, BCRC 31557, CBS 329.59, CCRC 31557, FAT 1196, FRR 3428, IFO 6230, IMI 068241, MUCL 31192, NBRC 6230, QM 8144, QM 8149, VKM F-274

Species of fungus

Penicillium estinogenum is an anamorph species of the genus of Penicillium which produces verruculogen.

== See also ==
- List of Penicillium species
