= Ulrich Schöllkopf =

German chemist (1927–1998)

- Born: 11 October 1927; Ebersbach an der Fils, Germany
- Died: 6 November 1998 (aged 71); Göttingen, Germany
- Education: University of Tübingen, University of Heidelberg
- Known for: Schöllkopf method
- Awards: Liebig Medal (1984)
- Scientific career
- Workplaces: University of Göttingen
- Doctoral advisor: Georg Wittig

Ulrich Schöllkopf (11 October 1927 – 6 November 1998) was a German chemist and together with Georg Wittig discovered the Wittig reaction in 1956. Later in 1981 he published the synthesis method for amino acids known as the Bislactimether method or Schöllkopf method.

Schöllkopf studied with Georg Wittig at the University of Tübingen where he received his PhD with work on the Wittig reaction in 1956 and received his habilitation at the University of Heidelberg with Wittig in 1961. He became professor at the University of Göttingen.
