= OU Citizen Science Soil Collection Program =

The OU Citizen Science Soil Collection Program is a University of Oklahoma crowdsourcing program collecting and examining soil samples for fungi that might contain anticancer activity.

== Origins ==
The project started in 2010 to research fungi that could potentially help create a type of compound known as a natural product. This is done by obtaining the fungi from a soil sample collected from a volunteer who mailed it to the program. The program was created at the University of Oklahoma and works with biomedical science researchers as a part of the Natural Products Discovery Group. The goal of this program is to create a natural product with ingredients obtained from various fungi, found in soil, that will help fight against cancer. This program gained traction on social media in 2015 when a member of the site known as Reddit made a post about the program. Since then, users have been sending in their soil samples and sharing updates about the project through comments on the post.

== Discoveries ==
The program has had one major discovery from the samples that have been submitted. The program found the natural product maximiscin. The sample came from a fungus named Tolypocladium. The sample has shown useful anticancer properties, and has inhibited cancer cell growth in mice.

== Methods ==
The samples are obtained through a method commonly referred to as crowdsourcing in citizen science, where citizens gather resources and submit them to researchers. After receiving the soil collecting kit, the volunteer can then go into their backyard and pick a spot where they would like to get their sample from. Once the sample has been collected it is sent back to the soil collecting team who grows the fungi by putting the sample on a petri dish and feeding it food such as grounded worms, tea, and simple sugars. The fungi are later identified by their internal transcribed spacer or ITS found in the DNA that identifies the species and distinguishes it from others. Separated from the soil, the fungus continues to grow in test tubes by feeding on cheerios. Later, the fungus samples are tested against cancer cells and pathogenic bacteria. The whole process varies from a few days to even years. The desired natural product of the fungi is then extracted through purification using chemical techniques when the sample is moved to grow in a larger bag of cheerios. Once extracted it takes up to weeks or even months to find the chemical structure after which the study and findings are shared with collaborators, typically pharmacologists who specialize in cancer and infectious disease biology.

== Public involvement ==
This program has gained users through multiple crowd-sourcing projects. The first attempt to crowd-source was through program members' family and friends. The program then gained national recognition from a "You Should Know" thread on the Reddit news sharing and discussion website. The program created a website hub for users to show interest in the project and to allow participants to obtain the collection kits. In December 2017, The program was featured in the Science Museum Oklahoma's smART Space gallery for visitors to see the program's fungi on display and to show how fungi shape the Earth.
