= Spirotryprostatin B =

- Spirotryptostatin B

Names
- Preferred IUPAC name (2S,3S,5aS)-2′-Hydroxy-3-(2-methylprop-1-en-1-yl)-5a,6,7,8-tetrahydro-3H,5H,10H-spiro[dipyrrolo[1,2-a:1′,2′-d]pyrazole-2,3′-indole]-5,10-dione

Identifiers
CAS Number	182234-26-0
3D model (JSmol)	Interactive image
ChemSpider	8104599
PubChem CID	9928968
- InChI: InChI=1S/C21H21N3O3/c1-12(2)10-17-21(13-6-3-4-7-14(13)22-20(21)27)11-16-18(25)23-9-5-8-15(23)19(26)24(16)17/h3-4,6-7,10-11,15,17H,5,8-9H2,1-2H3,(H,22,27)/t15-,17-,21-/m0/s1 Key: IWUYVKKHPNFWJG-WJPUGNRLSA-N
- SMILES: O=C1C=3N(C(=O)[C@H]2N1CCC2)[C@@H](\C=C(/C)C)[C@]5(C=3)c4ccccc4NC5=O

Properties
Chemical formula	C_{21}H_{21}N_{3}O_{3}
Molar mass	363.417 g·mol^{−1}
- Except where otherwise noted, data are given for materials in their standard state (at 25 °C [77 °F], 100 kPa). verify (what is ?) Infobox references

Spirotryprostatin B is an indolic alkaloid found in the Aspergillus fumigatus fungus that belongs to a class of naturally occurring 2,5-diketopiperazines. Spirotryprostatin B and several other indolic alkaloids (including Spirotryprostatin A, as well as other tryprostatins and cyclotryprostatins) have been found to have anti-mitotic properties, and as such they have become of great interest as anti-cancer drugs. Because of this, the total syntheses of these compounds is a major pursuit of organic chemists, and a number of different syntheses have been published in the chemical literature.

== Total synthesis ==
The first total synthesis was accomplished in 2000 by the Danishefsky group at Columbia University, with a number of other syntheses following shortly thereafter by Williams, Ganesan, Fuji, Carreira, Horne, Overman, and most recently Trost.

From a synthetic point of view, the most challenging structural features of the molecule are the C3 spirocyclic ring juncture and the adjacent prenyl-substituted carbon. Approaches toward preparing the skeleton of spirotryprostatin B have varied considerably.

Danishefsky spirotryprostatin B synthesis

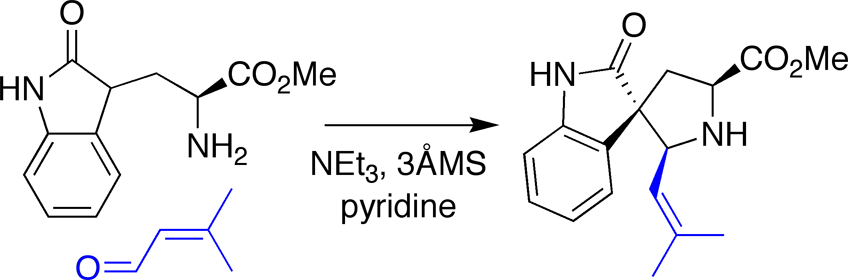

In the Danishefsky synthesis, an amine derived from tryptophan was condensed with an aldehyde, triggering a Mannich-type reaction wherein the pendant oxindole acted as a nucleophile toward the intermediate iminium species.

Williams spirotryprostatin B synthesis

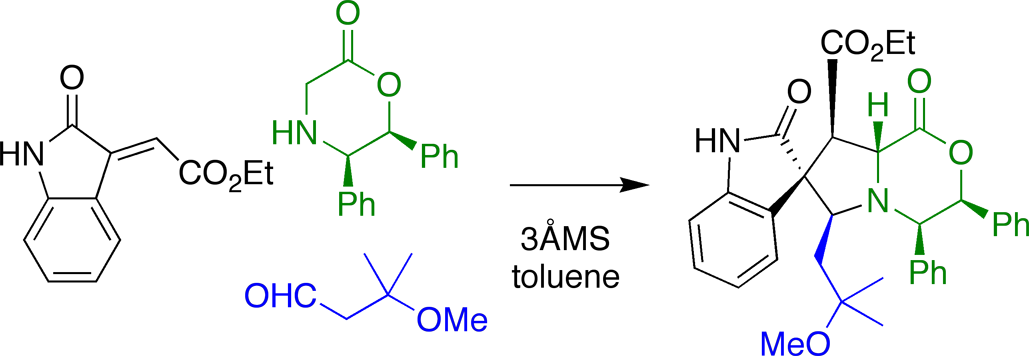

The synthesis by the Williams group utilized a 3-component coupling reaction. A secondary amine was combined with an aldehyde to form an intermediate azomethine ylide, which underwent a 1,3-dipolar cycloaddition with an unsaturated oxindole also present in the reaction mixture.

Ganesan spirotryprostatin B synthesis

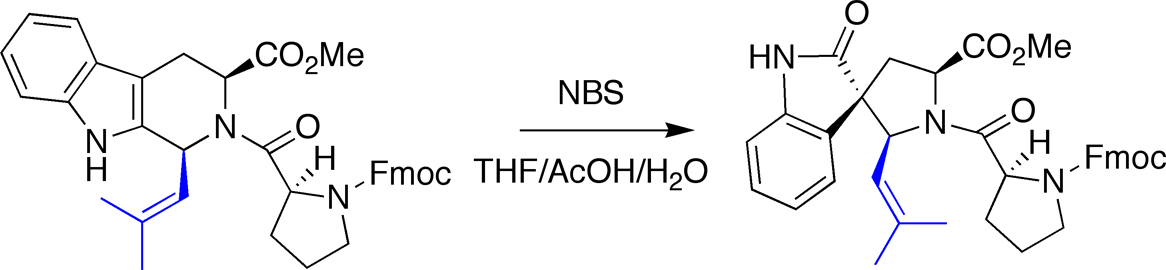

Ganesan made use of a biomimetic strategy in his synthesis of spirotryprostatin B. An indole was treated with N-bromosuccinimide to trigger an oxidative rearrangement, forming the quaternary stereocenter in a diastereoselective manner.

Fuji spirotryprostatin B synthesis

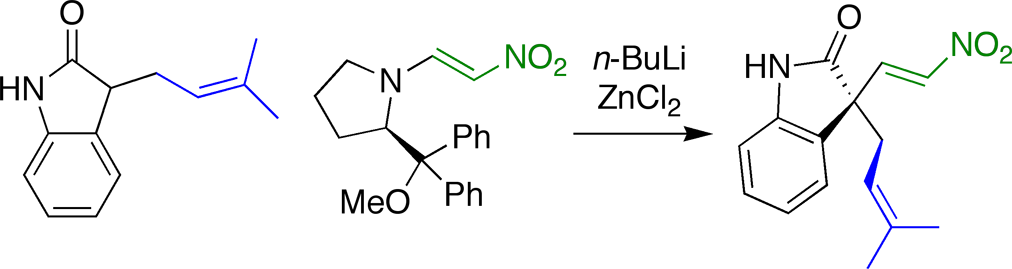

In the synthesis developed by the Fuji group, the stereochemistry at the spirocyclic carbon was established by a nitroolefination reaction. An oxindole with pendant prenyl group was reacted with a nitroolefin bearing a chiral leaving group.

Carreira spirotryprostatin B synthesis

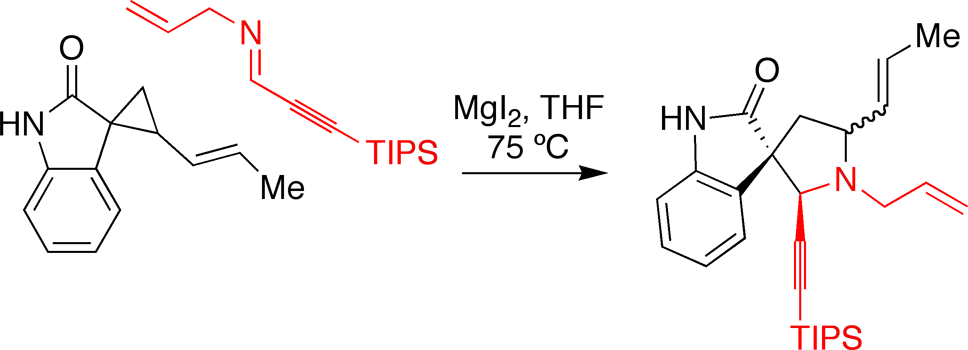

The Carreira group made use of a magnesium iodide promoted annulation reaction in their approach toward spirotryprostatin B. An oxindole bearing a cyclopropane was reacted with an imine in the presence of the magnesium iodide, triggering the ring-expansion reaction.

Horne spirotryprostatin B synthesis

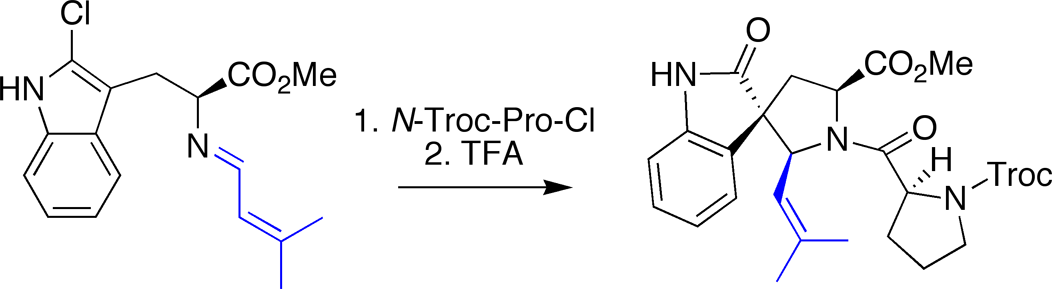

Horne's synthesis of spirotryprostatin B also made use of a Mannich-type process, wherein a chloro-indole served as the pro-nucleophile. The cyclization was triggered by treating the pendant imine with the acyl chloride derived from proline. The resulting iminium species was attacked by the chloro-indole, forming the spirocyclic bond.

Overman spirotryprostatin B synthesis

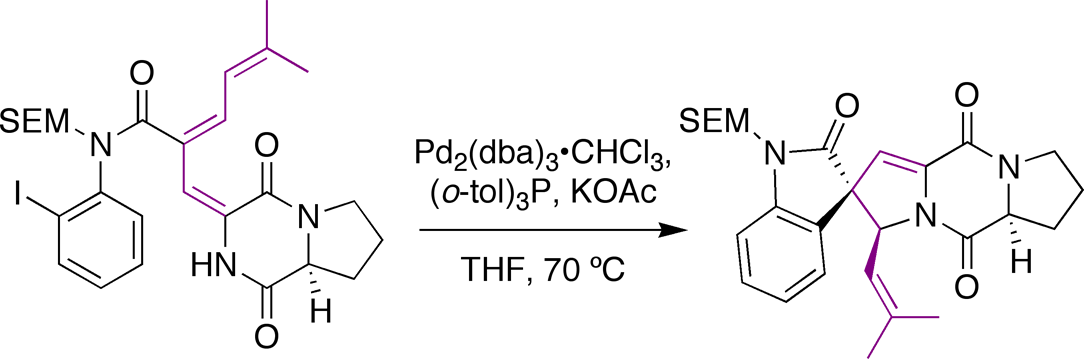

The Overman group utilized a Heck reaction to prepare the molecule. An iodo-aniline with a tethered alkene was subjected to palladium catalysis. The intermediate palladium-allyl species was intercepted by the pendant amide nitrogen to generate the prenyl stereocenter in the same reaction.

Trost spirotryprostatin B synthesis

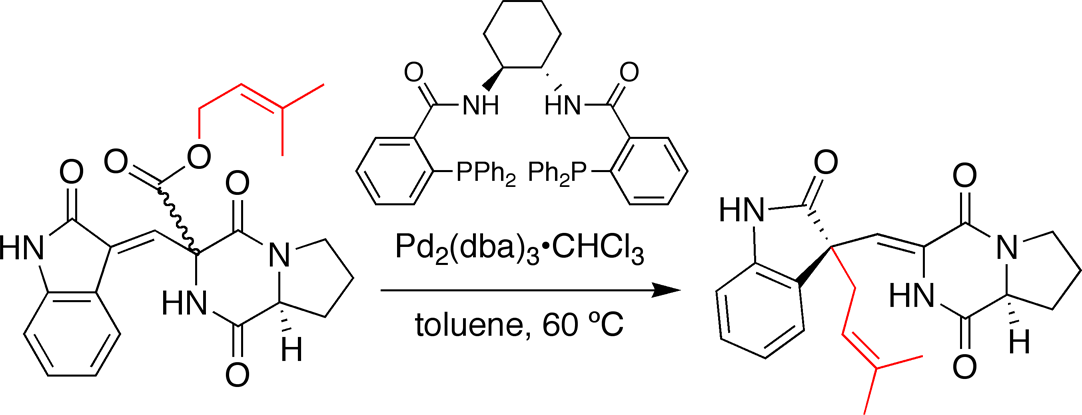

In the synthesis developed by the Trost group, the stereochemistry at the spirocyclic ring juncture is established by a decarboxylation-prenylation sequence, reminiscent of the Carroll reaction. Here, a prenyl ester serves as both the nucleophile and electrophile precursor. Upon treatment with a chiral palladium catalyst the prenyl group ionizes and decarboxylates. The resulting ion pair subsequently recombines to generate the prenylated product. Notably, double bond migration occurs and the prenyl group is attacked at the oxindole carbon.
