= Schöllkopf method =

The Schöllkopf method or Schöllkopf Bis-Lactim Amino Acid Synthesis is a method in organic chemistry for the asymmetric synthesis of chiral amino acids. The method was established in 1981 by Ulrich Schöllkopf. In it glycine is a substrate, valine a chiral auxiliary and the reaction taking place an alkylation.

== Reaction mechanism ==
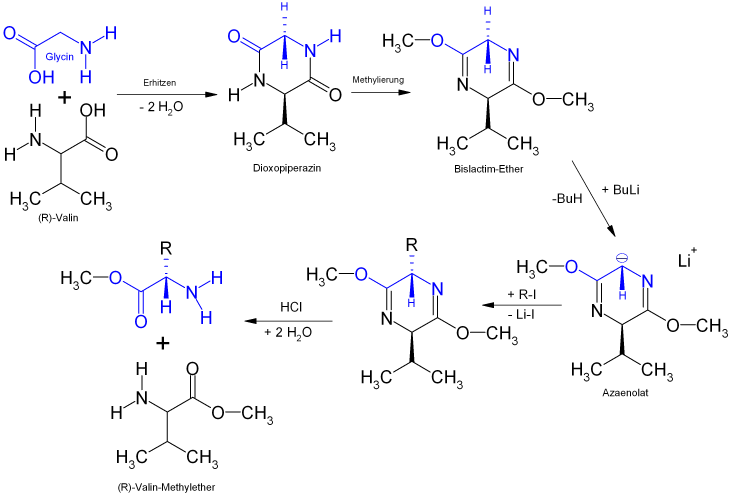
Reaction mechanism for the Schöllkopf method

The dipeptide derived from glycine and (R-)valine is converted into a 2,5-Diketopiperazine (a cyclic dipeptide). Double O-methylation gives the bis-lactim. A proton is then abstracted from the prochiral position on glycine with n-BuLi. The next step decides the stereoselectivity of the method: One face of the carbanionic center is shielded by steric hindrance from the isopropyl residue on valine. The reaction of the anion with an alkyl iodide will form the alkylated product with a strong preference for just one enantiomer. In the final step the dipeptide is cleaved by acidic hydrolysis in two amino acid methyl esters which can be separated from each other.

With valine Schöllkopf selected the natural proteinogenic amino acid with the largest non-reactive and nonchiral residue in order to achieve the largest possible stereoselectivity, generally speaking enantiomeric excess of over 95% ee is feasible.

With the Schöllkopf method all amino acids can be synthesised when a suitable R-I reagent is available. R does not need to be an alkyl group but can also be more complicated. The method is limited to the laboratory for the synthesis of exotic amino acids. Industrial applications are not known. One disadvantage is limited atom economy.
