= Stephacidin =

Antitumor alkaloids

Structures of Stephacidin B and Stephacidin A

Stephacidin A and B are antitumor alkaloids isolated from the fungus Aspergillus ochraceus that belong to a class of naturally occurring 2,5-diketopiperazines. This unusual family of fungal metabolites are complex bridged 2,5-diketopiperazine alkaloids that possess a unique bicyclo[2.2.2]diazaoctane core ring system and are constituted mainly from tryptophan, proline, and substituted proline derivatives where the olefinic unit of the isoprene moiety has been formally oxidatively cyclized across the α-carbon atoms of a 2,5-diketopiperazine ring. The molecular architecture of stephacidin B, formally a dimer of avrainvillamide, reveals a complex dimeric prenylated N-hydroxyindole alkaloid that contains 15 rings and 9 stereogenic centers and is one of the most complex indole alkaloids isolated from fungi. Stephacidin B rapidly converts into the electrophilic monomer avrainvillamide in cell culture, and there is evidence that the monomer avrainvillamide interacts with intracellular thiol-containing proteins, most likely by covalent modification.

Conversion of dimer Stephacidin B to monomer Avrainvillamide

Avrainvillamide, which contains a 3-alkylidene-3H-indole 1-oxide function, was identified in culture media from various strains of Aspergillus and is reported to exhibit antimicrobial activity against multidrug-resistant bacteria. The avrainvillamide and stephacidins family of structurally complex anticancer natural products are active against the human colon HCT 116 cell line. The signature bicyclo[2.2.2]diazaoctane ring system common to these alkaloids has inspired numerous synthetic approaches.
