= Bicyclomycin =

Antibiotic

Clinical data
- Trade names: bicozamycin
- ATC code: None

Identifiers
- IUPAC name: (1S,6R)-6-Hydroxy-5-methylene-1-[(1'S,2'S)-1,2,3-trihydroxy-2-methylpropyl]-2-oxa-7,9-diazabicyclo[4.2.2]decane-8,10-dione
- CAS Number: 38129-37-2
- PubChem CID: 65807
- ChemSpider: 59222
- UNII: J03U9E2P82
- KEGG: C11259
- ChEBI: CHEBI:60584

Chemical and physical data
- Formula: C_{12}H_{18}N_{2}O_{7}
- Molar mass: 302.283 g·mol^{−1}
- 3D model (JSmol): Interactive image
- SMILES: C[C@](CO)([C@@H]([C@@]12C(=O)N[C@@](C(=C)CCO1)(C(=O)N2)O)O)O
- InChI: InChI=1S/C12H18N2O7/c1-6-3-4-21-12(7(16)10(2,19)5-15)9(18)13-11(6,20)8(17)14-12/h7,15-16,19-20H,1,3-5H2,2H3,(H,13,18)(H,14,17)/t7-,10-,11+,12-/m0/s1; Key:WOUDXEYYJPOSNE-VKZDFBPFSA-N

Bicyclomycin (Bicozamycin) is a broad spectrum antibiotic, active against Gram-negative bacteria and the Gram-positive bacterium Micrococcus luteus, that was isolated from Streptomyces sapporonesis and Streptomyces aizumenses in 1972. It belongs to a class of naturally occurring 2,5-diketopiperazines, that are among the most numerous of all the naturally occurring peptide antibiotics. This clinically useful antibiotic is rapidly absorbed, has low toxicity and has been used to treat bacterial diarrhea in humans and pigs.

== Mechanism of action ==
Bicyclomycin is the only known selective inhibitor of the rho enzyme, a RecA-type ATPase, which is the major termination factor in Escherichia coli. X-ray crystallographic images taken of the bicyclomycin-rho complex have been used to understand the molecular basis for the drug's unique mode of action.

== Physical properties ==
Bicyclomycin is a crystalline, colorless, water-soluble, and weakly basic substance (mp 187-189 °C) that is soluble in methanol, and sparingly in ethanol, is practically insoluble in most organic solvents, and is unstable in alkaline solution.

== Structure–activity relationships and Antibiotic potency ==
The (1S, 6R, 1’S, 2’S)-stereochemistry and pharmacophore (in orange and black) required for good activity

In an attempt to increase the potency and its antimicrobial spectrum, a series of synthetic and semisynthetic derivatives were investigated. Structure–activity relationship (SAR) studies have shown that the C(1) triol and the [4.2.2]-bicyclic ring were essential for bicyclomycin-rho inhibitory activity whereas the C(5)−C(5a) exomethylene moiety was not. Further SAR studies showed that 5a-substituted derivatives can be prepared that were an order of magnitude more efficient than bicyclomycin in the inhibition of rho. Bicyclomycin is considered a weak antibiotic and when used alone, bicyclomycin failed to rapidly kill growing cultures of Escherichia coli; however, the additional presence of bacteriostatic concentrations of inhibitors of gene expression such as tetracycline, chloramphenicol or rifampicin led to rapid killing. This lethal synergy has been considered as one way to address the growing problem of antimicrobial resistance.

== Synthesis ==
Bicyclomycin, initially produced on large scale from the fermentation harvest of an improved strain of S. sapporonensis, has also been synthesised; many derivatives have also been prepared. Most of the synthetic approaches to bicyclomycin have started with a preformed 2,5-diketopiperazine.

Synthetic route to Bicyclomycin

Williams synthesis starts from the para-methoxybenzyl protected 2,5-diketopiperazine 1, bis bromination to give the 3,6-dibromide followed by thiolate displacements with sodio-2-thiopyridine gave the syn di(thiopyridine) derivative which was condensed with the silyl ketene acetal of y-butyrolactone in presence of silver triflate (AgOTf) to give the mono lactone which upon reduction with LiAlH_{4} afforded the diol 2. Cyclization of 2 in the presence of silver triflate gave the bicyclo-[4.2.2] alcohol 3. Dehydration to the key olefin proceeded in good overall yield followed by bridgehead carbanion oxidation with molecular oxygen gave the single hydroxylation product 4. Formation of the dianion of 4 followed by aldol reaction with acetal aldehyde 5 gave the aldol product with the desired relative configuration. Protection of the C-1'-hydroxyl as the corresponding trifluoroacetate followed by cleavage of the acetonide and p-methoxybenzyl groups with ceric ammonium nitrate followed by methanolysis on silica gel gave racemic bicyclomycin 6. Use of the optically active aldehyde analogue of 5 allowed preparation of optically active 6.
