= Spirotryprostatin A =

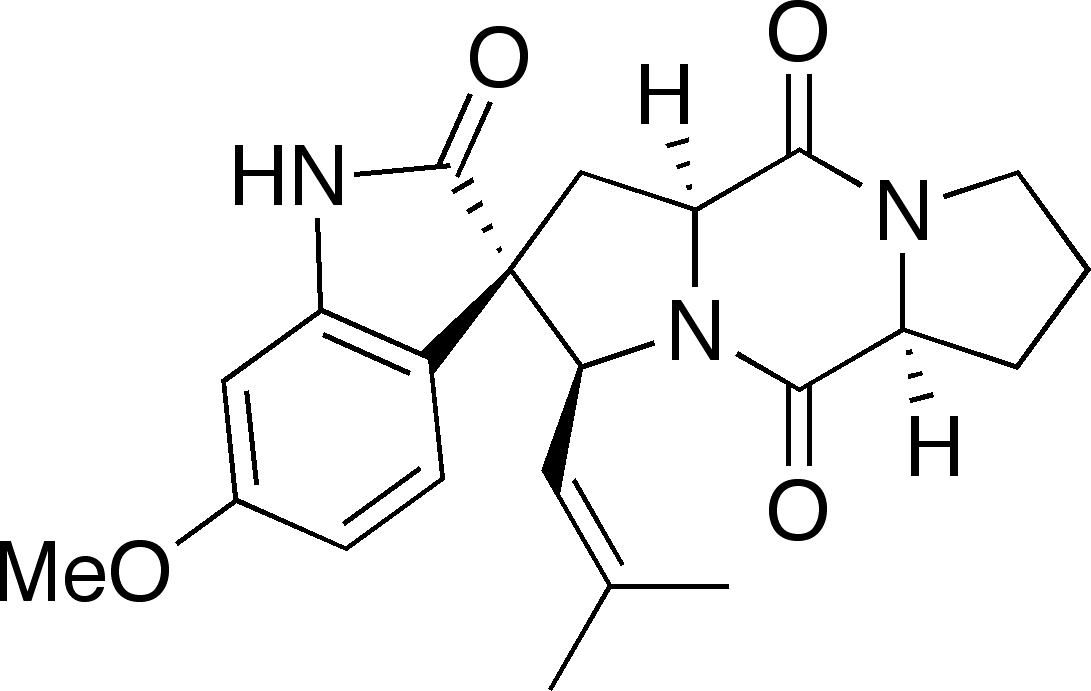
- Spirotryptostatin A

Names
- Preferred IUPAC name (2S,3S,5aS,10aS)-2′-Hydroxy-6′-methoxy-3-(2-methylprop-1-en-1-yl)-1,5a,6,7,8,10,10a-hexahydro-3H,5H,10H-spiro[dipyrrolo[1,2-a:1′,2′-d]pyrazine-2,3′-indole]-5,10-dione

Identifiers
CAS Number	182234-25-9
3D model (JSmol)	Interactive image
ChEMBL	ChEMBL549475
ChemSpider	8583811
PubChem CID	10408374
CompTox Dashboard (EPA)	DTXSID501046361
- InChI: InChI=1S/C22H25N3O4/c1-12(2)9-18-22(14-7-6-13(29-3)10-15(14)23-21(22)28)11-17-19(26)24-8-4-5-16(24)20(27)25(17)18/h6-7,9-10,16-18H,4-5,8,11H2,1-3H3,(H,23,28)/t16-,17-,18-,22-/m0/s1 Key: MQJKGSIAJNXSCM-ORGXJRBJSA-N
- SMILES: CC(=C[C@H]1[C@]2(C[C@@H]3N1C(=O)[C@@H]4CCCN4C3=O)C5=C(C=C(C=C5)OC)NC2=O)C

Properties
Chemical formula	C_{22}H_{25}N_{3}O_{4}
Molar mass	395.43 g/mol
- Except where otherwise noted, data are given for materials in their standard state (at 25 °C [77 °F], 100 kPa). verify (what is ?) Infobox references

Spirotryprostatin A is an indolic alkaloid from the 2,5-Diketopiperazine class of natural products found in the Aspergillus fumigatus fungus. Spirotryprostatin A and several other indolic alkaloids (including Spirotryprostatin B, as well as other tryprostatins and cyclotryprostatins) have been found to have anti-mitotic properties, and as such they have become of great interest as anti-cancer drugs. Because of this, the total syntheses of these compounds is a major pursuit of organic chemists, and a number of different syntheses have been published in the chemical literature.

One such total synthesis was published in 1999, which showed that the isopropylidene side chain was not necessary to the biological activity of the compound, leading to a number of new theorized analogues.
