= Phenylahistin =

Names
- IUPAC name (3S,6Z)-3-Benzyl-6-{[5-(2-methyl-3-buten-2-yl)-1H-imidazol-4-yl]methylene}-2,5-piperazinedione

Identifiers
CAS Number	200815-37-8
3D model (JSmol)	Interactive image
ChEMBL	ChEMBL319291
ChemSpider	7974262
PubChem CID	9798496
CompTox Dashboard (EPA)	DTXSID801336373
- InChI: InChI=1S/C20H22N4O2/c1-4-20(2,3)17-14(21-12-22-17)11-16-19(26)23-15(18(25)24-16)10-13-8-6-5-7-9-13/h4-9,11-12,15H,1,10H2,2-3H3,(H,21,22)(H,23,26)(H,24,25)/b16-11-/t15-/m0/s1 Key: GWMHBVLPNWHWGW-CNYBTUBUSA-N
- SMILES: CC(C)(C=C)C1=C(N=CN1)/C=C\2/C(=O)N[C@H](C(=O)N2)CC3=CC=CC=C3

Properties
Chemical formula	C_{20}H_{22}N_{4}O_{2}
Molar mass	350.422 g·mol^{−1}
- Except where otherwise noted, data are given for materials in their standard state (at 25 °C [77 °F], 100 kPa). Infobox references

Phenylahistin is a metabolite produced by the fungus Aspergillus ustus that belongs to a class of naturally occurring 2,5-diketopiperazines featuring a dehydrohistidine residue that exhibit important biological activities, such as anti-cancer or neurotoxic effects.

Phenylahistin is a microtubule binding agent that exhibits cytotoxic activities against a wide variety of tumor cell lines. A series of synthetic analogs were prepared to remove the chirality and optimize biological activity. These studies led to the potent anti-tumor agent plinabulin, which is active in multidrug-resistant (MDR) tumor cell lines.
