= Maximiscin =

Names
- Preferred IUPAC name Methyl (3R,4R,5R,6R)-6-({3-[(1R,2S,4R,6S)-2-ethenyl-4,6-dimethylcyclohexyl]-4-hydroxy-2-oxopyridin-1(2H)-yl}oxy)-3,4,5-trihydroxycyclohex-1-ene-1-carboxylate

Identifiers
CAS Number	1612154-44-5
3D model (JSmol)	Interactive image
ChEMBL	ChEMBL3903473
ChemSpider	34485502
PubChem CID	132521702
- InChI: InChI=1S/C23H31NO8/c1-5-13-9-11(2)8-12(3)17(13)18-15(25)6-7-24(22(18)29)32-21-14(23(30)31-4)10-16(26)19(27)20(21)28/h5-7,10-13,16-17,19-21,25-28H,1,8-9H2,2-4H3/t11-,12+,13-,16+,17-,19+,20+,21-/m1/s1 Key: BHUFOFQGYXAGAC-XMGLCDBZSA-N
- SMILES: COC(=O)C1=C[C@H](O)[C@H](O)[C@H](O)[C@@H]1ON1C=CC(O)=C([C@@H]2[C@@H](C)C[C@@H](C)C[C@H]2C=C)C1=O

Properties
Chemical formula	C_{23}H_{31}NO_{8}
Molar mass	449.500 g·mol^{−1}
- Except where otherwise noted, data are given for materials in their standard state (at 25 °C [77 °F], 100 kPa). Infobox references

Maximiscin is a polyketide-shikimate chemical compound isolated from Tolypocladium that shows tumor growth suppression in an animal model. The discovery of maximiscin was the result of a citizen scientist crowdsourcing project, OU Citizen Science Soil Collection Program, by the University of Oklahoma. The soil sample which yielded maximiscin was sent by a woman from Salcha, Alaska.
