= Fumitremorgin =

Fumitremorgins

- Fumitremorgins A-C

Identifiers
CAS Number	A: 12626-18-5; B: 12626-17-4; C: 118974-02-0
3D model (JSmol)	A: Interactive image; B: Interactive image; C: Interactive image
ChEBI	A: CHEBI:72766; B: CHEBI:64531; C: CHEBI:72763
ChEMBL	B: ChEMBL3885413; C: ChEMBL410316
ChemSpider	A: 96882; B: 94836; C: 357779
KEGG	A: C20564; B: C20630; C: C20604
PubChem CID	A: 107713; B: 105113; C: 403923
UNII	A: ZR1C7949XT; B: ITN5B384F8
- InChI: A: InChI=1S/C32H41N3O7/c1-18(2)12-14-40-28-26-21-11-10-20(39-7)16-23(21)34-25(15-19(3)4)41-42-31(5,6)17-24(27(26)34)35-29(36)22-9-8-13-33(22)30(37)32(28,35)38/h10-12,15-16,22,24-25,28,38H,8-9,13-14,17H2,1-7H3/t22-,24-,25+,28-,32+/m0/s1 Computed by InChI 1.0.6 (PubChem release 2021.10.14) Key: ACGHJVZDNQZJOV-BMOJZYMJSA-N; B: InChI=1S/C27H33N3O5/c1-15(2)10-12-28-20-14-17(35-5)8-9-18(20)22-23(28)21(13-16(3)4)30-25(32)19-7-6-11-29(19)26(33)27(30,34)24(22)31/h8-10,13-14,19,21,24,31,34H,6-7,11-12H2,1-5H3/t19-,21-,24-,27+/m0/s1 Key: WEIYXEFMCIRZHC-MWGWWEMPSA-N; C: InChI=1S/C22H25N3O3/c1-12(2)9-18-20-15(14-7-6-13(28-3)10-16(14)23-20)11-19-21(26)24-8-4-5-17(24)22(27)25(18)19/h6-7,9-10,17-19,23H,4-5,8,11H2,1-3H3/t17-,18-,19-/m0/s1 Key: DBEYVIGIPJSTOR-FHWLQOOXSA-N
- SMILES: A: CC(=CCO[C@H]1C2=C3[C@H](CC(OO[C@@H](N3C4=C2C=CC(=C4)OC)C=C(C)C)(C)C)N5[C@@]1(C(=O)N6CCC[C@H]6C5=O)O)C; B: CC(=CCN1C2=C(C=CC(=C2)OC)C3=C1[C@@H](N4C(=O)[C@@H]5CCCN5C(=O)[C@@]4([C@H]3O)O)C=C(C)C)C; C: CC(=C[C@H]1C2=C(C[C@@H]3N1C(=O)[C@@H]4CCCN4C3=O)C5=C(N2)C=C(C=C5)OC)C

Properties
Chemical formula	A: C_{32}H_{41}N_{3}O_{7} B: C_{27}H_{33}N_{3}O_{5} C: C_{22}H_{25}N_{3}O_{3}
- Except where otherwise noted, data are given for materials in their standard state (at 25 °C [77 °F], 100 kPa). Infobox references

Fumitremorgins are tremorogenic metabolites of Aspergillus and Penicillium that belong to a class of naturally occurring 2,5-diketopiperazines.

== Biosynthesis ==
Biosynthesis pathway of fumitremorgin pathway involves several different enzymes. FtmA is a nonribosomal peptide synthase. Both FtmB and FtmH are prenyltransferase. Three different cytochrome P450 monooxygenases involved in the biosynthesis of fumitremorgin C are FtmC, FtmE, and FtmG. Furthermore, FtmD is proposed to function as the methyltransferase. The synthesis starts with the formation of brevianamide F. FtmA catalyzes the nonribosomal peptide synthesis (NRPS) of this diketopiperazine product from two amino acids, L-tryptophan and L-proline. Then, another enzyme, FtmB, prenylates the product to form tryprostatin B. At this point, there are two separate pathways. FtmE may cyclize tryprostatin B to form demethoxyfumitremorgin C, or FtmC may oxidize tryprostatin B to form desmethyltrprostatin A by adding a hydroxyl group to the C-6 of the indole ring. The later pathway is followed by methylation to form tryprostatin A. The enzyme that catalyzes this methylation reaction has not been fully identified, but FtmD is suspected to be the plausible candidate. Then, the cyclization of tryprostatin A produces fumitremorgin C by forming the C-N bond by FtmE. The subsequent hydroxylation of fumitremorgin C takes place at C-12 and C-13 to form 12α, 13α-dihydroxyfumitremorgin C by FtmG. Fumitremorgin B is formed by another prenyltransferase, FtmH, that prenylates at N-1 of the indole ring (N-vinyl rather than N-prenyl incorrectly shown in the scheme below).

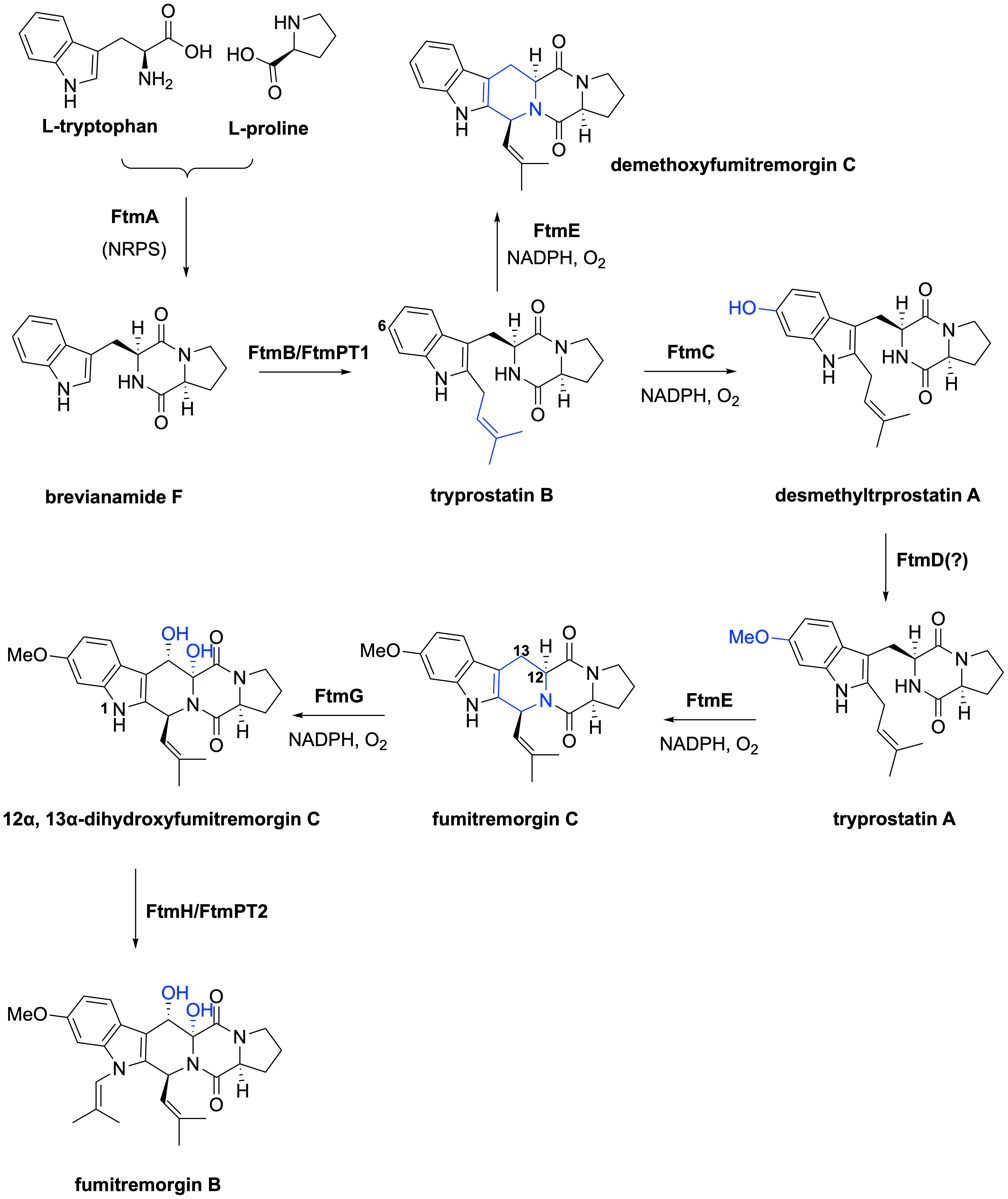
Proposed biosynthesis pathway of fumitremorgins
