= Amino acid activation =

Process of attaching Amino acids to their tRNA

Amino acid activation (also known as aminoacylation or tRNA charging) refers to the attachment of an amino acid to its respective transfer RNA (tRNA). The reaction occurs in the cell cytosol and consists of two steps: first, the enzyme aminoacyl tRNA synthetase catalyzes the binding of adenosine triphosphate (ATP) to a corresponding amino acid, forming a reactive aminoacyl adenylate intermediate (AMP-amino acid) and releasing inorganic pyrophosphate (PP_{i}). Subsequently, aminoacyl tRNA synthetase binds the AMP-amino acid to a tRNA molecule, releasing AMP and attaching the amino acid to the tRNA. The resulting aminoacyl-tRNA is said to be charged.

Amino acid activation is a prerequisite to the initiation of translation and protein synthesis. Peptide bond formation is an endergonic, thermodynamically unfavorable process, so amino acids must be activated by covalent linkage to tRNA molecules. The energy stored within the aminoacyl-tRNA bond is used to drive peptide bond formation. Activation thus enhances the reactivity of the amino acid and drives peptide bond synthesis. Moreover, the inorganic pyrophosphate released during the activation process is rapidly hydrolyzed in a highly exergonic reaction. The energy released by this hydrolysis helps drive the otherwise energetically unfavorable reaction forward. It's the hydrolyzation of the ATP that makes peptide bond formation a favorable reaction because of the inorganic phosphate acting as a leaving group, resulting in a high negative free energy.

Following activation, the aminoacylated tRNA is ready to proceed to the initiation stage of translation, in which the aminoacyl-tRNA and mRNA transcript bind to the ribosome.

== Mechanism ==
=== Reaction Steps ===
During amino acid activation, each amino acid (aa) is attached to its corresponding tRNA molecule. The coupling reaction is catalyzed by a group of enzymes called aminoacyl-tRNA synthetases (named after the reaction product aminoacyl-tRNA or aa-tRNA). The coupling reaction proceeds in two steps:

First, the carboxyl group of the backbone of the amino acid is covalently linked to the α-phosphate of the ATP molecule, releasing inorganic pyrophosphate (PP_{i}) and creating a 5’ aminoacyl adenylate intermediate (aa-AMP).

1. aa + ATP ⟶ aa-AMP + PP_{i}

Second, the aminoacyl adenylate intermediate undergoes nucleophilic attack, attaching an aminoacyl group to the tRNA at the 3’-OH, and freeing an AMP molecule.

2. aa-AMP + tRNA ⟶ aa-tRNA + AMP

There are two classes of aminoacyl t-RNA synthetases: class I and class II. Class I enzymes catalyze transfer of the aminoacyl group to the 2’-OH of the tRNA molecule, and a subsequent transesterification reaction moves the aminoacyl group to the 3’-OH of the tRNA. Class II enzymes catalyze transfer of the aminoacyl group directly to the 3’-OH of the tRNA in a single step. The resulting aminoacyl-tRNA molecule is identical regardless of the enzyme class.

The net reaction is:

aa + ATP + tRNA ⟶ aa-tRNA + AMP + PP_{i}

The amino acid is coupled to the terminal nucleotide at the 3’-end of the tRNA (the A in the sequence CCA) via an ester bond. The formation of the ester bond conserves a considerable part of the energy from the activation reaction. This stored energy provides the majority of the energy needed for peptide bond formation during translation.

=== Aminoacyl-tRNA synthetase ===
Each of the 20 amino acids are recognized by its specific aminoacyl-tRNA synthetase. The synthetases are usually composed of one to four protein subunits. The enzymes vary considerably in structure although they all perform the same type of reaction by binding ATP, one specific amino acid and its corresponding tRNA.

The most important activity of the aminoacyl-tRNA synthetase is to attach an amino acid to a tRNA, that can then interact with codons that identify its amino acid. Taking both similar acetylation function and amino acid motifs into consideration, 2 separate classes of aminoacyl-tRNA synthetases could be differentiated. Class I enzyme is normally monomeric and binds the tRNA acceptor stem from the minor groove. It adds amino acid to 2’-OH of the adenylate residue, moving it into the 3’-OH position. Meanwhile, Class II aminoacyl-tRNA synthetase is oligomeric and binds the tRNA acceptor stem from the major groove. The enzyme proceeds to add amino acid to the 3’-OH position directly.

The aminoacyl-tRNA synthetases can distinguish between different tRNAs and this recognition doesn't follow the same pattern. An aminoacyl-tRNA synthetase recognizes a set of sequentinal elements and binds tRNA with the respective amino acid. Examples of these elements vary: 1 base in the anticodon, 1 of 3 base pairs in the acceptor stem and others.

However, depending on the chirality of the amino acid, an aminoacyl-tRNA-synthase can actually disrupt the ester bond between D-amino acids and tRNA. This can happen if there is an editing domain that's lacking in the active site of that aminoacyl-tRNA-synthase.

=== Transfer RNA ===
During activation, the tRNA functions as an adaptor molecule, as posited by Francis Crick’s adaptor hypothesis. That is, the tRNA binds at one end to the specific amino acid of interest, and at the other end to the mRNA codon sequence. The tRNA molecule effectively acts as an intermediary between the two, enabling translation of the genetic code to an amino acid sequence.

== Editing and Proofreading ==
The specificity of the amino acid activation is as critical for the translational accuracy as the correct matching of the codon with the anticodon. The reason is that the ribosome only sees the anticodon of the tRNA during translation. Thus, the ribosome will not be able to discriminate between tRNAs with the same anticodon but linked to different amino acids. By attaching the correct amino acid to its associated tRNA molecule, activation ensures both specificity and fidelity of translation.

Editing mechanisms occur when there is a misactivation of amino acids, where an amino acid is attached to the wrong tRNA molecule. The aminoacyl-tRNA synthetase can hydrolyze the amino acid before it attaches to the wrong tRNA molecule (pre-transfer editing) or deacylate the mischarged tRNA after attachment (post-transfer editing).

The error frequency of the amino acid activation reaction is approximately 1 in 10,000 despite the small structural differences between some of the amino acids.

== History ==
Amino acid activation was first characterized by Mahlon Hoagland, who found that amino acids could be activated by certain enzymes to form an aminoacyl adenylate intermediate compound. The enzymes were discovered to be aminoacyl t-RNA synthetases, responsible for catalyzing the linkage of an amino acid to a small RNA molecule. Hoagland and his collaborator, Paul Zamecnik, later discovered that the small RNA molecule was a tRNA, and they identified it as a key facilitator of translation.

Amino acid activation is a key reaction in many biochemical and metabolic processes. In particular, leucine natural killer treatment of interleukin-18 activated cells triggers the mTORC1 metabolic sensor, which indicates that mTORC1 causes amino acid-driven activation due to a high expression in amino acid transporters.

The Inhibition of CD98/LAT1 amino acid transporters abroad mTORC1 activation driven by leucine, decreased the activity of the NK cell-effector.
