= Brevianamide F =

Names
- Preferred IUPAC name (3S,8aS)-3-[(1H-Indol-3-yl)methyl]hexahydropyrido[1,2-a]pyrazine-1,4-dione
- Other names Cyclo-(L-Trp-L-Pro)

Identifiers
| CAS Number | 38136-70-8 |
| 3D model (JSmol) | Interactive image |
| ChemSpider | 157941 |
| PubChem CID | 181567 |
| UNII | 76XZ426FPP |
| CompTox Dashboard (EPA) | DTXSID10959075 |
- InChI: InChI=1S/C16H17N3O2/c20-15-14-6-3-7-19(14)16(21)13(18-15)8-10-9-17-12-5-2-1-4-11(10)12/h1-2,4-5,9,13-14,17H,3,6-8H2,(H,18,20)/t13-,14-/m0/s1 Key: RYFZBPVMVYTEKZ-KBPBESRZSA-N
- SMILES: [H][C@@]12CCCN1C(=O)[C@H](Cc1c[nH]c3ccccc13)NC2=O

Properties
| Chemical formula | C_{16}H_{17}N_{3}O_{2} |
| Molar mass | 283.331 g·mol^{−1} |
- Except where otherwise noted, data are given for materials in their standard state (at 25 °C [77 °F], 100 kPa). Infobox references

Brevianamide F , also known as cyclo-(L-Trp-L-Pro), belongs to a class of naturally occurring 2,5-diketopiperazines. It is the simplest member and the biosynthetic precursor of a large family of biologically active prenylated tryptophan-proline 2,5-diketopiperazines that are produced by the fungi A. fumigatus and Aspergillus sp. It has been isolated from the bacterium Streptomyces sp. strain TN58 and shown to possess activity against the Gram-positive bacteria S. aureus and Micrococcus luteus. It has also been isolated from Bacillus cereus associated with the entomopathogenic nematode Rhabditis (Oscheius) sp. and shown to have antifungal activity against T. rubrum, C. neoformans, and C. albicans, better than amphotericin B. Although the proline 2,5-diketopiperazines are the most abundant and structurally diverse 2,5-diketopiperazines found in food, cyclo(L-Trp-L-Pro) has only been found as a minor 2,5-diketopiperazine (8.2 ppm) in autolyzed yeast extract. Initially, cyclo(L-Trp-L-Pro) and its DL, LD, and DD isomers showed potential for use in the treatment of cardiovascular dysfunction, but they were later shown to be hepatotoxic.

== See also ==
- Brevianamide
