= Plinabulin =

Names
- IUPAC name (3Z,6Z)-3-Benzylidene-6-{[5-(2-methyl-2-propanyl)-1H-imidazol-4-yl]methylene}-2,5-piperazinedione

Identifiers
CAS Number	714272-27-2
3D model (JSmol)	Interactive image
ChEBI	CHEBI:177413
ChemSpider	8125252
KEGG	D09655
PubChem CID	9949641
UNII	986FY7F8XR
CompTox Dashboard (EPA)	DTXSID201031311
- InChI: InChI=1S/C19H20N4O2/c1-19(2,3)16-13(20-11-21-16)10-15-18(25)22-14(17(24)23-15)9-12-7-5-4-6-8-12/h4-11H,1-3H3,(H,20,21)(H,22,25)(H,23,24)/b14-9-,15-10- Key: UNRCMCRRFYFGFX-TYPNBTCFSA-N; InChI=1/C19H20N4O2/c1-19(2,3)16-13(20-11-21-16)10-15-18(25)22-14(17(24)23-15)9-12-7-5-4-6-8-12/h4-11H,1-3H3,(H,20,21)(H,22,25)(H,23,24)/b14-9-,15-10- Key: UNRCMCRRFYFGFX-TYPNBTCFBU
- SMILES: O=C3/C(=C/c1nc[nH]c1C(C)(C)C)NC(=O)C(=C\c2ccccc2)\N3

Properties
Chemical formula	C_{19}H_{20}N_{4}O_{2}
Molar mass	336.395 g·mol^{−1}
- Except where otherwise noted, data are given for materials in their standard state (at 25 °C [77 °F], 100 kPa). Infobox references

Plinabulin (provisional name BPI-2358, formerly NPI-2358) is a small molecule under development by BeyondSpring Pharmaceuticals, and has completed a world-wide Phase 3 clinical trial for non-small cell lung cancer. Plinabulin is being investigated for the reduction of chemotherapy-induced neutropenia and for anti-cancer effects in combination with immune checkpoint inhibitors and in KRAS mutated tumors.

Plinabulin blocks the polymerization of tubulin in a unique manner, resulting in multi-factorial effects including an enhanced immune-oncology response, activation of the JNK pathway and disruption of the tumor blood supply.
