= Tagetitoxin =

- Structure of (+)-tagetitoxin confirmed via total synthesis and bioactivity assay

Names
- Systematic IUPAC name (2R,4aS,5R,6S,7R,7aR)-2-acetamido-6-ammonio-2,6-dicarboxy-7-hydroxyhexahydro-5H-cyclopenta[b][1,4]oxathiin-5-yl hydrogen phosphate

Identifiers
CAS Number	87913-21-1
3D model (JSmol)	Interactive image
ChemSpider	103185
PubChem CID	115340
CompTox Dashboard (EPA)	DTXSID20868987
- InChI: InChI=1S/C11H17N2O11PS/c1-3(14)22-5-4(12)6(24-25(19,20)21)10(9(16)17)2-26-11(18,8(13)15)7(5)23-10/h4-7,18H,2,12H2,1H3,(H2,13,15)(H,16,17)(H2,19,20,21)/t4-,5-,6-,7-,10+,11-/m1/s1 Key: UVAAUIDYGIWLMB-XJKNRETDSA-N; InChI=1/C11H17N2O11PS/c1-3(14)22-5-4(12)6(24-25(19,20)21)10(9(16)17)2-26-11(18,8(13)15)7(5)23-10/h4-7,18H,2,12H2,1H3,(H2,13,15)(H,16,17)(H2,19,20,21)/t4-,5-,6-,7-,10+,11-/m1/s1 Key: UVAAUIDYGIWLMB-XJKNRETDBI
- SMILES: O=C(N)[C@]1(O)SC[C@@]2(O[C@@H]1[C@H](OC(=O)C)[C@@H](N)[C@H]2OP(=O)(O)O)C(=O)O

Properties
Chemical formula	C_{11}H_{17}N_{2}O_{11}PS
Molar mass	416.29 g·mol^{−1}
- Except where otherwise noted, data are given for materials in their standard state (at 25 °C [77 °F], 100 kPa). Infobox references

Tagetitoxin (TGT) is a bacterial phytotoxin produced by Pseudomonas syringae pv. tagetis.

== Chemical structure ==
When TGT was first isolated, it was only partially characterized. The first proposed chemical structure of TGT involved an eight-membered ring (see below), but this was revised shortly afterward to two possible bicyclic structures based on NMR and mass spectrometry.

All so far proposed structures for tagetitoxin

This structures, however, have been questioned. To elucidate the absolute configuration, attempts at confirming the structure by organic synthesis were conducted. In 2015, Porter et al. proposed an alternative structure of TGT based on extensive 2D NMR data, still, however, didn't manage to assign the absolute configuration. In 2020 the structure from 2015 was finally confirmed via the total synthesis, followed by bioactivity assay to assign the absolute configuration (only (+)-tagetitoxin was bioactive).

== Mechanism of action ==
TGT interferes with development of chloroplasts in young plant leaves thereby causing chlorosis. The natural target of the toxin is chloroplast RNA polymerase. Chloroplast RNA polymerase belongs to ubiquitous family of multisubunit RNA polymerases (RNAP) and is most closely related to bacterial enzymes. In vitro, TGT inhibits bacterial RNAPs from Escherichia coli and Thermus thermophilus, and eukaryotic RNA polymerase III. In contrast, eukaryotic RNA polymerase I and II as well as single-subunit viral RNA polymerases are relatively insensitive to the compound. TGT binds in the bacterial enzyme's active site and inhibits initiation and elongation phases of transcription as well as pyrophosphorolysis of the nascent RNA. However, the detailed mechanism of inhibition remains a subject of heated debate.

It has been suggested that TGT forms a ternary RNAP-NTP-TGT complex and inhibits phosphodiester bond synthesis either by binding an inhibitory magnesium ion or by trapping a flexible active site domain in an inactive conformation. The third theory suggests that TGT forms predominantly a binary RNAP-TGT complex and inhibits RNAP translocation along the DNA by mimicking the transcription byproduct pyrophosphate.
