= Verruculogen =

Names
- Preferred IUPAC name (5R,10S,10aR,14aS,15bS)-10,10a-Dihydroxy-7-methoxy-2,2-dimethyl-5-(2-methylprop-1-en-1-yl)-1,10,10a,12,13,14,14a,15b-octahydro-5H,15H-3,4-dioxa-5a,11a,15a-triazacycloocta[lm]indeno[5,6-b]fluorene-11,15(2H)-dione

Identifiers
CAS Number	12771-72-1
3D model (JSmol)	Interactive image
ChemSpider	10405461
ECHA InfoCard	100.162.193
EC Number	634-189-1
KEGG	C20045
PubChem CID	104862
CompTox Dashboard (EPA)	DTXSID30894030
- InChI: InChI=1S/C27H33N3O7/c1-14(2)11-20-29-18-12-15(35-5)8-9-16(18)21-22(29)19(13-26(3,4)37-36-20)30-24(32)17-7-6-10-28(17)25(33)27(30,34)23(21)31/h8-9,11-12,17,19-20,23,31,34H,6-7,10,13H2,1-5H3 Key: LRXYHMMJJCTUMY-UHFFFAOYSA-N
- SMILES: CC(=CC1N2C3=C(C=CC(=C3)OC)C4=C2C(CC(OO1)(C)C)N5C(=O)C6CCCN6C(=O)C5(C4O)O)C

Properties
Chemical formula	C_{27}H_{33}N_{3}O_{7}
Molar mass	511.575 g·mol^{−1}
- Except where otherwise noted, data are given for materials in their standard state (at 25 °C [77 °F], 100 kPa). Infobox references

Verruculogen is a mycotoxin produced by certain strains of aspergillus that belongs to a class of naturally occurring 2,5-diketopiperazines. It is an annulated analogue of cyclo(L-Trp-L-Pro) which belongs to the most abundant and structurally diverse class of tryptophan-proline 2,5-diketopiperazine natural products. It produces tremors in mice due to its neurotoxic properties. It also tested positive in a Salmonella/mammalian microsome assay and was shown to be genotoxic. It is a potent blocker of calcium-activated potassium channels.

== Synthesis ==
Both verruculogen and its isoprenyl derivative fumitremorgin A belong to the only family of alkaloids with an eight-membered endoperoxide ring, and both have been synthesised involving ligand-controlled C–H borylation.
