= Cyclodipeptide synthases =

Family of enzymes

Cyclodipeptide synthases (CDPSs) are a newly defined family of peptide-bond forming enzymes that are responsible for the ribosome-independent biosynthesis of various cyclodipeptides, which are the precursors of many natural products with important biological activities. As a substrate for this synthesis, CDPSs use two amino acids activated as aminoacyl-tRNAs (aa-tRNAs), therefore diverting them from the ribosomal machinery. The first member of this family was identified in 2002 during the characterization of the albonoursin biosynthetic pathway in Streptomyces noursei. CDPSs are present in bacteria, fungi, and animal cells.

== History and research ==
From 2002, when the first description of a CDPSs was done, until now, the number of reported CDPSs in databases has experienced a significant growth (800 in June 2017). It is probable that these cyclopeptides are implicated in numerous biosynthetic pathways. However, their products’ diversity has not been very explored. The activity of 32 new CPDS has been described. This fact raises the number of experimentally characterized CDPS up to 100 (approximately). Moreover, this research has identified several consensus sequences associated to the formation of a specific cyclodipeptide, enhancing the predictive model of specificity of CDPS. This improved prediction method facilitates the deciphering of independent ways of CDPS.

== Structure ==
CDPSs don’t have a specific structure, given each one has its own specific function, but they still have common architectures, such as a Rossmann-fold domain. CDPSs are monomers that have been found to display a strong structural similarity to the catalytic domains of class Ic aminoacyl tRNA synthetases: both these families, CDPSs and class Ic aaRSs, have a Rossmann-fold domain and their structures can be superimposed showing many structural analogies.

CDPSs characteristically feature a deep surface-accessible pocket bordered by the catalytic residues, which is where the catalysis of amide bond formation takes place. This structure is positioned similarly to the aminoacyl binding pocket in aaRSs, which leads to thinking that CDPSs evolved from class Ic aaRSs.

CDPSs and aaRSs present substantial differences though, such as the absence of ATP-binding motifs in CDPSs, given that these use, unlike aaRSs, amino acids that have already been activated.

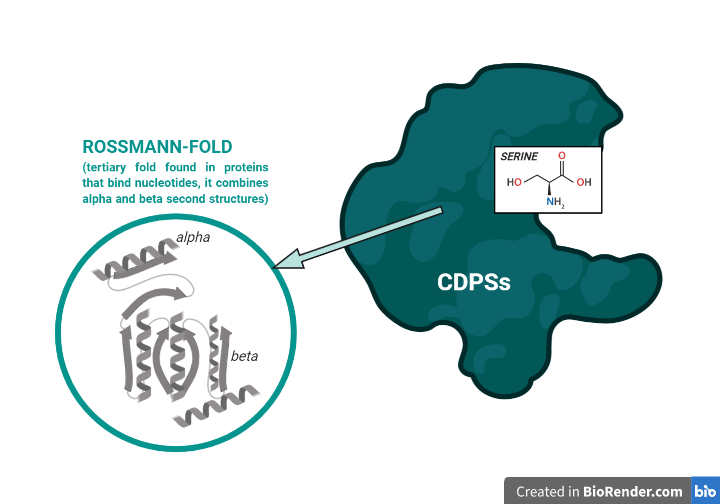
CDPSs don’t have a specific structure, given each one has its own specific function, but they still have common architectures, such as a Rossmann-fold domain.

== Catabolic reaction: How do CDPSs synthesize cyclodipeptides? ==
It was firstly thought that nonribosomal peptide synthetases (NRPSs) were the responsible ones of CDPs construction, either through specific biosynthetic pathways or with the premature liberation of dipeptidyl intermediates meanwhile the elongation process was done. On account of AlbC discovery, an enzyme with the ability to specifically create CDP using loaded ARNt as substrates, it was disclosed that there was a second route for the cyclodipeptide production.

CDPSs' catalytic cycle begins with the binding of the first aa-tRNA, with its aminoacyl transferred onto a conserved serine residue to form an aminoacyl-enzyme intermediate. The second aa-tRNA interacts with this intermediate so that its aminoacyl is transferred to the aminoacyl-enzyme to form a dipeptidyl-enzyme intermediate. Finally, the dipeptidyl goes through an intramolecular cyclization leading to the final cyclodipeptide.

== Classification ==
CDPSs can be divided into two distinct subfamilies named NYH and XYP, distinguished depending on the conserved residues within their respective active sites, which let experts predict their aminoacyl-tRNA substrates. Both subfamilies mainly differ in the first half of their Rossmann fold, this two structures correspond to two different structural solutions to facilitate the reactivity of the catalytic serine residue. Some NYH’s crystal structures have been identified. These CDPSs’ structure contain a Rossmann fold domain.

NYH form a larger group than XYP, therefore there is more information about them than about the XYP subfamily.

== Biosynthesis ==
CDPS-encoding genes are found in genomic locations with genes encoding additional biosynthetic enzymes (CDPS DmtB1 is an example, encoded by the gene of dmt1 locus). These additional biosynthetic enzymes are for example: oxidoreductases, prenyltransferases, methyltransferases, or cyclases and some proteins as cytochrome P450s.

== Applications ==
Recently bioinformatics are designing a way to predict CDPSs products to understand better how their catalytic process works. Moreover, research has brought to light a lot of chemical information about CDPSs pathways. Different projects can also create chemical diversity.

The importance of the cyclodipeptides production has attracted immense attention because of their properties, not only as antifungal or antibacterial but also as a biological target. That is why an important part of the pharmaceutical products contain CDPs.

== See also ==
- Cyclic peptide
- Aminoacyl tRNA synthetase

== Notes ==
In elongation reference, go for "Part of transcription of DNA into mRNA".
