= List of investigational sexual dysfunction drugs =

Investigational sexual dysfunction drugs

This is a list of investigational sexual dysfunction drugs, or drugs that are currently under development for clinical use for the treatment of sexual dysfunction but are not yet approved. Sexual function disorders include anorgasmia, atrophic vaginitis (vaginal atrophy), decreased libido, dyspareunia (painful sexual intercourse), erectile dysfunction, female sexual dysfunction (female sexual arousal disorder (FSAD)/hypoactive sexual desire disorder (HSSD)), male sexual dysfunction, premature ejaculation, vulvodynia (vulva pain), paraphilias, and hypersexuality, among others.

Chemical/generic names are listed first, with developmental code names, synonyms, and brand names in parentheses. The format of list items is "Name (Synonyms) – Mechanism of Action – Indication [Reference]". The section that the drug is in corresponds to its highest developmental phase, not its phase for all listed indications.

This list was last comprehensively updated in January 2026. It is likely to become outdated with time.

== Under development ==
=== Preregistration ===
- Orenetide (BP-101; BP101; Libicore; Desirix) – undefined mechanism of action (synthetic small peptide) – female sexual dysfunction
- Tadalafil oral film (AQST-119; Exordia) – phosphodiesterase PDE5 inhibitor – erectile dysfunction
- Tadalafil oral film (Exordia; INT-007; INT0007; INT0007/2006) – phosphodiesterase PDE5 inhibitor – erectile dysfunction

=== Phase 3 ===
- Clomipramine/sildenafil (CDFR-0812) – combination of clomipramine (tricyclic antidepressant (TCA), serotonin–norepinephrine reuptake inhibitor (SNRI), other actions) and sildenafil (phosphodiesterase PDE5 inhibitor) – premature ejaculation
- Gepirone (Ariza; BMY-13805-1; BMY-13805; Exxua; Gepirone ER; MJ-13805; Org-33062; TGFK07AD; Travivo; Variza) – serotonin 5-HT_{1A} receptor agonist, other actions – decreased libido
- Nitroglycerin gel (Eroxon; glyceryl trinitrate topical gel; MED-2001; MED-2003; MED-2004; MED-2005; MED-3000; MED2002) – guanylate cyclase stimulant, nitric oxide donor, nitric oxide stimulant – erectile dysfunction
- Prasterone vaginal (dehydroepiandrosterone; DHEA; Intrarosa; Vaginorm) – androgen (androgen receptor agonist), other actions – decreased libido
- Sacubitril/valsartan (AHU-377/valsartan; Enrest; Enresuto; Entresto; Entresto Sprinkle; LCZ-696; LCZ-696A; Neparvis; valsartan/AHU-377; valsartan/sacubitril) – combination of sacubitril (neprilysin inhibitor) and valsartan (angiotensin II receptor type 1 (AT_{1}) antagonist) – erectile dysfunction

=== Phase 2 ===
- Aildenafil (methisosildenafil) – phosphodiesterase PDE5 inhibitor – erectile dysfunction
- AN-788 (IP-2018; IP2018; NSD788; NSD-788) – serotonin–dopamine reuptake inhibitor (SDRI) – erectile dysfunction
- Apomorphine intranasal (AL-101; intranasal apomorphine) – non-selective dopamine receptor agonist, other actions – erectile dysfunction, female sexual dysfunction
- Autologous mesenchymal stem cell therapy (autologous bone marrow-derived mesenchymal stem cell therapy; Cellgram; Cellgram-ED; Cellgram-LC; Cerecellgram-spine; Hearticellgram-AMI; Immunocellgram; Impocellgram; Livercellgram; Lungcellgram; MSC-1; MSC-2) – cell replacement – erectile dysfunction
- Botulinum toxin A (AboBoNT-A; AbobotulinumtoxinA; Alluzience; Azzalure; BoNT-A; BTX-A-HAC; BTX-A-HAC NG; Clostridium botulinum toxin type A haemagglutinin complex; Dysport; Dysport NG; Dysport RU; Dysport Solution; Dysport Next Generation; Reloxin) – acetylcholine release inhibitor and neuromuscular blocking agent – vulvodynia
- Bupropion/trazodone (Lorexys; Orexa; S1P-104; S1P-205; SIP-104; trazodone/bupropion) – combination of bupropion (norepinephrine–dopamine reuptake inhibitor (NDRI), other actions) and trazodone (serotonin antagonist and reuptake inhibitor (SARI), various actions) – erectile dysfunction, female sexual dysfunction, male sexual dysfunction
- Buspirone/testosterone (Lybridos; testosterone/buspirone) – combination of buspirone (serotonin 5-HT_{1A} receptor agonist, other actions) and testosterone (androgen) – female sexual dysfunction
- BZ-371A (PnPP-19) – nitric oxide stimulant – erectile dysfunction, female sexual dysfunction
- Cligosiban (IX-01; PF-3274167) – oxytocin receptor antagonist – premature ejaculation
- Estetrol (Donesta; E4) – estrogen (estrogen receptor agonist) – atrophic vaginitis, female sexual dysfunction
- Estriol vaginal ring (VR-102; VR102; long-acting estriol vaginal ring) – estrogen (estrogen receptor agonist) – atrophic vaginitis
- Fadanafil (XZP-5849) – phosphodiesterase PDE5 inhibitor – erectile dysfunction
- FKW-00GA (FKW00GA; TGW-00AA; TGW00AA; TGWOOAA; TGW-OOAA) – serotonin 5-HT_{1A} receptor agonist, serotonin 5-HT_{2A} receptor antagonist – sexual function disorders
- Onabotulinum toxin A (BoNTA; Botox; botulinum toxin A injectable; GSK-1358820; GSK1358820; OnabotA X; OnabotulinumtoxinA X; Vistabel; Vistabex) – acetylcholine release inhibitor and neuromuscular blocking agent – premature ejaculation
- OPK-88004 (LY-2452473; TT701) – selective androgen receptor modulator (SARM) – erectile dysfunction
- Pudafensine (IP2015; IP-2015) – serotonin–norepinephrine–dopamine reuptake inhibitor (SNDRI) – erectile dysfunction, vulvodynia, female sexual dysfunction
- Sildenafil/testosterone (Lybrido; testosterone/sildenafil) – combination of sildenafil (phosphodiesterase PDE5 inhibitor) and testosterone (androgen) – female sexual dysfunction
- Sildenafil topical – phosphodiesterase PDE5 inhibitor – female sexual dysfunction
- Testosterone intranasal (low-dose) (MPP-14; Noseafix; TBS-2; Tefina) – androgen (androgen receptor agonist) – anorgasmia, decreased libido
- TGFK-09SD (TGFK09SD) – serotonin 5-HT_{1A} receptor agonist – female sexual dysfunction
- Volufralin (LIB-01; LIB01; DIC-2024; DIC2024; Libiguin) – indirect melanocortin MC_{4} receptor potentiator – erectile dysfunction, premature ejaculation

=== Phase 1/2 ===
- Mirabegron (Betanis; Betmiga; Betmiga PR; Myrbetriq; Myrbetriq Granules; YM-178) – β_{3}-adrenergic receptor agonist – erectile dysfunction

=== Phase 1 ===
- KH-001 (KH001) – atypical selective serotonin reuptake inhibitor (SSRI), phosphodiesterase (PDE) inhibitor (purified Sceletium tortuosum (kanna) alkaloid; possibly mesembrine) – premature ejaculation
- VV-913 (VV913) – undefined mechanism of action – premature ejaculation

=== Clinical phase unknown ===
- Sildenafil orally-dissolving film (NAL8238; NAL-8238; sildenafil ODF) – phosphodiesterase PDE5 inhibitor – erectile dysfunction
- Tadalafil orally-dissolving film (NAL8233; NAL-8233; tadalafil ODF) – phosphodiesterase PDE5 inhibitor – erectile dysfunction

=== Preclinical ===
- CF-602 – adenosine A_{3} receptor modulator – erectile dysfunction
- S1B-307 – "central nervous system modulator" – anorgasmia, female sexual dysfunction
- S1B-408 – undefined mechanism of action – anorgasmia
- S1B-3006 (S1B0-3006; S1B3006) – "central nervous system modulator" – sexual function disorders

=== Phase unknown ===
- Pirenzepine topical (topical pirenzepine; WST-057; WST-1; WST01; WST1/analgesic; WST57) – muscarinic acetylcholine M_{1} receptor antagonist – sexual function disorders

== Not under development ==
=== No development reported ===
- AB-101 (RJ-101) – undefined mechanism of action – female sexual dysfunction
- Apomorphine intranasal – non-selective dopamine receptor agonist, other actions – erectile dysfunction, female sexual dysfunction
- Armodafinil ((R)-modafinil; D-modafinil; NH-02D; NH02D) – atypical dopamine reuptake inhibitor (DRI) – premature ejaculation
- Deuterated testosterone (d3-testosterone) – androgen (androgen receptor agonist) – female sexual dysfunction
- Epelsiban (GSK557296; GSK-557296) – oxytocin receptor antagonist – premature ejaculation
- Estradiol/testosterone topical gel (LibiGel-E/T; testosterone/estradiol topical gel) – combination of estradiol (estrogen) and testosterone (androgen) – female sexual dysfunction
- Fibroblast growth factor 1 (FGF-1; FGF1; Acidic FGF; aFGF; Cardio Vascu-Grow; CVBT-141P; CVBT-141S; CVBT-141A; CVBT-141B; CVBT-141C; CVBT-141D; CVBT-141E; CVBT-141ED; CVBT-141F; CVBT-141G; CVBT-141H; FGF-1(141); VT-141D; VT-141ED; VT-141P; VT-141S) – fibroblast growth factor receptor (FGFR) agonist – erectile dysfunction
- FKK-01PD (FKK-01PD; TGHW-01AP; TGHW01AP) – non-selective dopamine receptor agonist, other actions (apomorphine prodrug) – erectile dysfunction
- GSK-958108 (GSK958108) – serotonin 5-HT_{1A} receptor antagonist – premature ejaculation
- HCP-1302 (HCP1302) – undefined mechanism of action – erectile dysfunction
- Lidocaine topical gel – sodium channel blocker, local anesthetic – dyspareunia
- PTL-2015 – undefined mechanism of action – erectile dysfunction
- Research programme: nerve-targeted gene therapy - Periphagen (NC-3; NE-2; NE2-Endomorphin; NG-2; NG2-GAD; NN1-Neurotrophin) – various actions – erectile dysfunction
- Research programme: sexual dysfunction therapy - Palatin Technologies (PL-6983) – melanocortin receptor modulators – erectile dysfunction, female sexual dysfunction
- Sildenafil (KW-25084) – phosphodiesterase PDE5 inhibitor – erectile dysfunction
- Sildenafil orally soluble film (CURE-5003; CUREfilm Blue) – phosphodiesterase PDE5 inhibitor – erectile dysfunction
- Sildenafil oral spray (Duromist; NVD-401; SUD-003; SUD-004; SUDA-004; Sudamist) – phosphodiesterase PDE5 inhibitor – erectile dysfunction
- Tadalafil dry powder inhalation (Tadalafil Technosphere) – phosphodiesterase PDE5 inhibitor – erectile dysfunction
- Tadalafil orodispersible film tablet (Caliberi) – phosphodiesterase PDE5 inhibitor – erectile dysfunction
- Tadalafil topical (Extrinsa) – phosphodiesterase PDE5 inhibitor – female sexual dysfunction
- Tadalafil/tamsulosin – combination of tadalafil (phosphodiesterase PDE5 inhibitor) and tamsulosin (α_{1}-adrenergic receptor antagonist) – erectile dysfunction
- Tunodafil (ecocarbamate; gluconocin; yonkenafil) – phosphodiesterase PDE5 inhibitor – erectile dysfunction
- Vilazodone (EMD-68843; SB-659746A; Viibryd) – serotonin reuptake inhibitor (SRI), serotonin 5-HT_{1A} receptor agonist – sexual function disorders
- Zotarolimus (ABT-578; Endeavor; Endeavor Resolute; MDT-4107 DES; Resolute DES; Resolute Integrity; Resolute Onyx; ZoMaxx) – FK-binding protein 12 (FKBP12) ligand and mechanistic target of rapamycin (mTOR) inhibitor – erectile dysfunction

=== Preregistration submission withdrawal ===
- Lasofoxifene (AZU-101; CP-336156; CP-336156-CB; Fablyn; HLX-78; Oporia) – selective estrogen receptor modulator (SERM) – atrophic vaginitis

=== Suspended ===
- Alprostadil topical (Alprox-TD; Befar; Cold Chain Vitaros; Femprox; RayVa; Room Temperature Vitaros; Virirec; Vitaros; Vytaros; WC-3036) – prostaglandin E1 (PGE1) agonist – female sexual dysfunction

=== Discontinued ===
- Acolbifene/prasterone (dehydroepiandrosterone/acolbifene; DHEA/acolbifene; prasterone/acolbifene; Femivia) – combination of acolbifene (selective estrogen receptor modulator (SERM)) and prasterone (dehydroepiandrosterone; DHEA) (androgen, other actions) – decreased libido
- Alprostadil SEPA (prostaglandin E1 SEPA; alprostadil/soft enhancement of percutaneous absorption; Topiglan) – prostaglandin E1 (PGE1) agonist – erectile dysfunction
- Alprostadil/lidocaine (NM02216; NM100061) – combination of alprostadil (prostaglandin E1 (PGE1) agonist) and lidocaine (sodium channel blocker, local anesthetic) – premature ejaculation
- Amesergide (LY-237733; LY237733; LY-237,733) – serotonin 5-HT_{2A}, 5-HT_{2B}, and 5-HT_{2C} receptor antagonist, other actions – erectile dysfunction, premature ejaculation
- Apomorphine inhalation (VR-004; VR-040; VR-400) – non-selective dopamine receptor agonist, other actions – erectile dysfunction, female sexual dysfunction
- Apomorphine intranasal – non-selective dopamine receptor agonist, other actions – erectile dysfunction
- Avanafil (Razatus; Spedra; Stendra; TA-1790; Zepeed) – phosphodiesterase PDE5 inhibitor – female sexual dysfunction, premature ejaculation
- BAY-604552 (BAY98-7081; sGC activator) – guanylate cyclase stimulant – erectile dysfunction
- Bremelanotide (Rekynda; Vyleesi; PT-141) – melanocortin MC_{4} receptor agonist – erectile dysfunction
- CP-866087 (CP-866,087) – μ-opioid receptor antagonist – female sexual dysfunction
- DA-8031 (DA8031) – selective serotonin reuptake inhibitor (SSRI) – premature ejaculation
- Dapoxetine (IMD dapoxetine; YHD-1044) – selective serotonin reuptake inhibitor (SSRI) – premature ejaculation
- Delequamine (RS-15385; RS-15385197) – α_{2}-adrenergic receptor antagonist – erectile dysfunction
- Estradiol/testosterone transdermal (testosterone/estradiol transdermal) – combination of estradiol (estrogen) and testosterone (androgen) – female sexual dysfunction
- GM-1485 (GPI-1485; NIL-A) – immunophilin modulator – erectile dysfunction
- Heparin/lidocaine/sodium bicarbonate (alkalised lidocaine and heparin formulation; Hep-Lido-A compounded formulation; U-101; URG-101) – combination of heparin (Factor Xa inhibitor, thrombin inhibitor), lidocaine (sodium channel blocker, local anesthetic), and sodium bicarbonate (absorption enhancer) – dyspareunia
- hMaxi-K gene therapy (pVAX/hSlo; URO-902) – gene transference – erectile dysfunction
- INO-1001 (INO1001; Pardex) – poly(ADP-ribose) polymerase inhibitor – erectile dysfunction
- LGD-2941 (LGD2941; LGD122941; LGD-122941) – selective androgen receptor modulator (SARM) – female sexual dysfunction, male sexual dysfunction
- Melanotan II (MT-II; PT-14) – melanocortin receptor agonist – erectile dysfunction, male sexual dysfunction
- Milnacipran (Dalcipran; F-2207; Impulsor; Ixel; Joncia; Midacipran; Midalcipran; Savella; TN-912; Toledomin) – serotonin–norepinephrine reuptake inhibitor (SNRI) – vulvodynia
- Nitroglycerin topical (Anogesic; Cellegesic; Rectiv; Rectogesic) – nitric oxide donor – dyspareunia, vulvodynia
- NMI-870 – α_{2}-adrenergic receptor antagonist, nitric oxide donor – erectile dysfunction, female sexual dysfunction
- Oxytocin (oxytocin gel; oxytocin topical; Vagitocin) – oxytocin receptor agonist – atrophic vaginitis
- Pagoclone (IP-456; Panex; RP-62955) – GABA_{A} receptor positive allosteric modulator and nonbenzodiazepine/cyclopyrrolone – premature ejaculation
- PF-446687 (PF-00446687; PF-446,687) – melanocortin MC_{4} receptor agonist – sexual function disorders
- PF-592379 (PF-000592379; PF-592,379) – dopamine D_{3} receptor agonist – erectile dysfunction
- Research programme: therapeutics - Re-Pharm (RP-0217; RP0217) – protein phosphatase 2A (PP2A) inhibitor – sexual function disorders
- RO-0282425 (RO0282425) – melanocortin MC_{4} receptor agonist – erectile dysfunction
- RTN-001 (KD-027; SLX-2101; SLx-2101) – phosphodiesterase PDE5 inhibitor – erectile dysfunction
- SAR-407899 (SAR407899; SAR407899A) – Rho-associated kinase inhibitor – erectile dysfunction
- Sertraline (Aremis; Besitran; CP-51974; CP-51974-01; Gladem; J Zoloft; Lustral; Serad; Serlain; Tatig; Zoloft) – selective serotonin reuptake inhibitor (SSRI) – premature ejaculation
- Sildenafil (Revatio; Revatio IV; UK-92480; Viagra) – phosphodiesterase PDE5 inhibitor – female sexual dysfunction
- Tadalafil (Adcirca; Cialis; GF-196960; IC-351; LY-450190; Zalutia) – phosphodiesterase PDE5 inhibitor – female sexual dysfunction
- Tadalafil sublingual (APC-8000) – phosphodiesterase PDE5 inhibitor – erectile dysfunction
- Tadalafil/tamsulosin (CKD-397; tamsulosin/tadalafil) – combination of tadalafil (phosphodiesterase PDE5 inhibitor) and tamsulosin (α_{1}-adrenergic receptor antagonist) – erectile dysfunction
- Tadalafil/tamsulosin (YBH-1603) – phosphodiesterase PDE5 inhibitor – erectile dysfunction
- Testosterone topical (ESP-210) – androgen (androgen receptor agonist) – female sexual dysfunction
- Testosterone transdermal (FemTestosterone TDS) – androgen (androgen receptor agonist) – female sexual dysfunction
- Testosterone transdermal (Luramist; testosterone MDTS; testosterone transdermal spray) – androgen (androgen receptor agonist) – female sexual dysfunction
- TEMPE (Topical Eutectic Mixture for Premature Ejaculation) – undefined mechanism of action – premature ejaculation
- UK-357903 (UK-357,903) – phosphodiesterase PDE5 inhibitor – erectile dysfunction
- UK-390957 (UK-390,957) – serotonin reuptake inhibitor (SRI) – premature ejaculation
- UK-447841 (UK-447,841) – neprilysin inhibitor – female sexual dysfunction
- VML-670 (VML670; CEB-1555) – serotonin 5-HT_{1A} receptor agonist – female sexual dysfunction, male sexual dysfunction

== Clinically used drugs ==
=== Approved drugs ===
==== Phosphodiesterase PDE5 inhibitors ====
- Avanafil (Razatus; Spedra; Stendra; TA-1790; Zepeed) – phosphodiesterase PDE5 inhibitor – erectile dysfunction
- Lodenafil (CRIS-031; Helleva) – phosphodiesterase PDE5 inhibitor – erectile dysfunction
- Mirodenafil (Aibishi; Bravonto; Mvix; SK-3530) – phosphodiesterase PDE5 inhibitor – erectile dysfunction
- Sildenafil (Revatio; Revatio IV; UK-92480; Viagra) – phosphodiesterase PDE5 inhibitor – erectile dysfunction
- Sildenafil chewable tablets (Nurigra) – phosphodiesterase PDE5 inhibitor – erectile dysfunction
- Sildenafil orally soluble film (sildenafil ODF; SPO-1101; Vultis) – phosphodiesterase PDE5 inhibitor – erectile dysfunction
- Sildenafil orally soluble film (orodispersible sildenafil; Please; sildenafil oral dissolving film; sildenafil orally-disintegrating film; sildenafil OSF) – phosphodiesterase PDE5 inhibitor – erectile dysfunction
- Sildenafil oral spray (ASP-001; ASP-002; Bandol; Hezkue) – phosphodiesterase PDE5 inhibitor – erectile dysfunction
- Sildenafil oro-dispersible tablets (Erecta; FACSID-50) – phosphodiesterase PDE5 inhibitor – erectile dysfunction
- Simmerafil (Onvita; Onweida; semenafil; TPN-171; TPN-171-H) – phosphodiesterase PDE5 inhibitor – erectile dysfunction
- Tadalafil (Adcirca; Cialis; GF-196960; IC-351; LY-450190; Zalutia) – phosphodiesterase PDE5 inhibitor – erectile dysfunction
- Tadalafil oral disintegrating film (SPO-1102; Vulteum; tadalafil ODF) – phosphodiesterase PDE5 inhibitor – erectile dysfunction
- Tadalafil oral film (OGOOD) – phosphodiesterase PDE5 inhibitor – erectile dysfunction
- Udenafil (DA-8159; Jurvigo; ME-3113; MZ101; Udzire; WC-3043; WC-3055; Zydena) – phosphodiesterase PDE5 inhibitor – erectile dysfunction
- Vardenafil (BAY-389456; Levitra; Nuviva; Staxyn; vardenafil ODT; vardenafil orodispersible tablet; Vivanza) – phosphodiesterase PDE5 inhibitor – erectile dysfunction

==== Prostaglandin E1 (PGE1) agonists ====
- Alprostadil (Caverject; Prostaglandin E1) – prostaglandin E1 (PGE1) agonist – erectile dysfunction
- Alprostadil alfadex (alprostadil alfadex complex; alprostadil-alpha-cyclodextrin; Edex; Prostaglandin E1-α-cyclodextrin complex; Prostandin; Prostavasin; Rigidur; Sugiran; Vasaprostan; Vasoprost; Viridal) – prostaglandin E1 (PGE1) agonist – erectile dysfunction
- Alprostadil topical (Alprox-TD; Befar; Cold Chain Vitaros; Femprox; RayVa; Room Temperature Vitaros; Virirec; Vitaros; Vytaros; WC-3036) – prostaglandin E1 (PGE1) agonist – erectile dysfunction

==== Estrogens (estrogen receptor agonists) ====
- Conjugated estrogens (conjugated equine estrogens; CEEs; Premarin) – estrogen (estrogen receptor agonist) – atrophic vaginitis, dyspareunia
- Conjugated estrogens oral (Enjuvia; synthetic conjugated estrogens) – estrogen (estrogen receptor agonists) – atrophic vaginitis
- Conjugated estrogens/bazedoxifene (Aprela; bazedoxifene acetate/conjugated estrogens; bazedoxifene/conjugated estrogens; bazedoxifene/Premarin; BZA/CE; CE/BZA; conjugated estrogens/bazedoxifene acetate; Duavee; Duavive; Premarin/bazedoxifene; SERM + Premarin) – combination of conjugated estrogens (estrogen) and bazedoxifene (selective estrogen receptor modulator (SERM)) – atrophic vaginitis
- Estradiol (Estrofem; Innofem; oral estradiol; Vagifem; vaginal estradiol) – estrogen (estrogen receptor agonist) – atrophic vaginitis
- Estradiol transdermal micro patch (Estradot; Minivelle; Vivelle-Dot) – estrogen (estrogen receptor agonist) – atrophic vaginitis
- Estradiol vaginal (E2; 17β-estradiol; Estradiol VagiCap; Imvexxy; Joyesta; TX-12-004-HR; TX-004HR; VagiCap; Yuvvexy) – estrogen (estrogen receptor agonist) – atrophic vaginitis
- Estradiol acetate (Estrace; estradiol acetate intravaginal ring; estradiol acetate IVR; Femring; Menoring) – estrogen (estrogen receptor agonist) – atrophic vaginitis
- Estriol succinate vaginal gel (6α-hydroxyestradiol; Blissel; Gelistrol) – estrogen (estrogen receptor agonist) – atrophic vaginitis
- Estriol/lactobacillus (estriol-Lactobcillus acidophilus mixt.; estriol/lyophilised lactobacilli; Gynoflor; ultra-low dose estrogen/lactobacillus) – combination of estriol (estrogen) and lactobacillus (probiotic) – atrophic vaginitis
- Ospemifene (FC-1271a; Ophena; Osphena; Senshio) – selective estrogen receptor modulator (SERM) – atrophic vaginitis, dyspareunia

==== Other sex-hormonal agents ====
- Prasterone vaginal (dehydroepiandrosterone; DHEA; Intrarosa; Vaginorm) – androgen (androgen receptor agonist), other actions – atrophic vaginitis, dyspareunia
- Testosterone propionate (TP; Synandrol; Synerone) – androgen (androgen receptor agonist) – decreased libido
- Tibolone (Livial) – androgen, estrogen, and progestogen – atrophic vaginitis, dyspareunia, low sexual desire
- Triptorelin (Arvekap; AY-25650; BIM-21003; BN-52014; CL-118532; Debio-8200; Debio-8206; debio8200; Decapeptyl; Decapeptyl SR; Decapeptyl LP; Diphereline; Gonapeptyl; Moapar; Pamorelin; Pamorelin LA; Salvacyl; Trelstar; Trelstar Depot; Triptodur; Triptoreline; Tryptorelin; WY-42422) – gonadotropin-releasing hormone (GnRH) receptor agonist – paraphilias

==== Other drugs ====
- Apomorphine (Ixense; Spontane; TAK-251; Uprima) – non-selective dopamine receptor agonist, other actions – erectile dysfunction
- Bremelanotide (Rekynda; Vyleesi; PT-141) – melanocortin MC_{4} receptor agonist – female sexual dysfunction
- Dapoxetine (LY-210448; LY210448; LY-210,448; Priligy) – selective serotonin reuptake inhibitor (SSRI) – premature ejaculation
- Flibanserin (Addyi; BIMT-17; BIMT-17-BS; Girosa) – serotonin 5-HT_{1A} receptor agonist, serotonin 5-HT_{2A} receptor antagonist, other actions – female sexual dysfunction
- Lidocaine/prilocaine (Fortacin; Prilocaine Lidocaine Plethora; prilocaine/lidocaine; PSD-502; Senstend; Tempe) – combination of lidocaine (sodium channel blocker, local anesthetic) and prilocaine (sodium channel blocker, local anesthetic) – premature ejaculation
- Moxisylyte (thymoxamine) – α_{1}-adrenergic receptor antagonist – erectile dysfunction
- Papaverine (Pavabid) – phosphodiesterase PDE10A inhibitor, other actions – erectile dysfunction
- Phentolamine (Vasomax) – α_{1}- and α_{2}-adrenergic receptor antagonist – erectile dysfunction

==== Combination drugs ====
- Acecarbromal/quebracho/vitamin E (Afrodor) – various actions – erectile dysfunction
- Aviptadil/phentolamine (Invicorp; phentolamine/aviptadil; PSD-510; Vasopotin) – combination of aviptadil (vasoactive intestinal peptide (VIP) receptor agonist) and phentolamine (α-adrenergic receptor antagonist) – erectile dysfunction
- Papaverine/phentolamine – combination of papaverine (phosphodiesterase PDE10A inhibitor, other actions) and phentolamine (α-adrenergic recpetor antagonist) – erectile dysfunction
- Tadalafil/tamsulosin (Gugutams cap.; HCP-1303) – combination of tadalafil (phosphodiesterase PDE5 inhibitor) and tamsulosin (α_{1}-adrenergic receptor antagonist) – erectile dysfunction

=== Market withdrawal ===
- Conjugated estrogens oral (Cenestin; synthetic conjugated estrogens) – estrogen (estrogen receptor agonist) – atrophic vaginitis
- Testosterone transdermal (Intrinsa; Intrinsa CHF; Livensa; Testosterone transdermal TheraDerm MTX; WC3048; WC3049) – androgen (androgen receptor agonist) – female sexual dysfunction

=== Off-label drugs ===
- α_{2}-Adrenergic receptor antagonists (e.g., yohimbine, rauwolscine (found in yohimbe)) – erectile dysfunction, low sexual desire
- Androgens/anabolic steroids (androgen receptor agonists) (e.g., testosterone, testosterone esters, methyltestosterone) – low sexual desire
- Antiandrogens (e.g., GnRH modulators, high-dose estrogen therapy, high-dose progestogen therapy) – various mechanisms of action – paraphilias, hypersexuality, sexual deviance
- Antipsychotics (e.g., haloperidol) – dopamine receptor antagonists, other actions – paraphilias, hypersexuality, sexual deviance
- Bupropion (Wellbutrin, Zyban) – norepinephrine–dopamine reuptake inhibitor (NDRI), other actions – low sexual desire
- Buspirone (Buspar) – serotonin 5-HT_{1A} receptor agonist, other actions – low sexual desire
- Clomipramine (Anafranil) – tricyclic antidepressant (TCA), serotonin–norepinephrine reuptake inhibitor (SNRI), other actions – premature ejaculation
- Cyproheptadine (Periactin) – non-selective serotonin receptor antagonist, other actions – anorgasmia, low sexual desire/decreased libido
- Estrogens (e.g., estradiol, estradiol esters, ethinylestradiol) – estrogens (estrogen receptor agonists) – atrophic vaginitis, dyspareunia, vulvodynia, low sexual desire
- Horny goat weed (Epimedii herba) – unknown mechanism of action – low sexual desire
- Selective serotonin reuptake inhibitors (SSRIs) (e.g., sertraline, fluoxetine, paroxetine, citalopram, escitalopram) – premature ejaculation, paraphilias, hypersexuality, sexual deviance
- Selegiline (L-deprenyl; Eldepryl, Zelapar, Emsam) – monoamine oxidase B (MAO-B) inhibitor, other actions – low sexual desire
- Tramadol (Tramal) – μ-opioid receptor agonist, serotonin–norepinephrine reuptake inhibitor (SNRI), other actions – premature ejaculation
- Trazodone (Desyrel, Oleptro) – serotonin antagonist and reuptake inhibitor (SARI), various actions – erectile dysfunction, low sexual desire

== Recreational drugs ==
- Alcohol (ethanol/ethyl alcohol) – GABA_{A} receptor positive allosteric modulator
- Alkyl nitrites (poppers) (e.g., amyl nitrite) – nitric oxide donors, vasodilators, muscle relaxants, inhalants
- Cannabinoids (e.g., THC, cannabis, synthetic cannabinoids) – cannabinoid CB_{1} receptor agonists
- Dissociative hallucinogens (e.g., ketamine, methoxetamine, phencyclidine (PCP)) – ionotropic glutamate NMDA receptor antagonists
- Entactogens (empathogens) (e.g., MDMA (ecstasy), mephedrone, 6-APB, borax combo) – serotonin–norepinephrine–dopamine releasing agents (SNDRAs), other actions
- γ-Hydroxybutyric acid (GHB; oxybate) and prodrugs (e.g., GBL, 1,4-BD) – GABA_{B} and GHB receptor agonists
- Phosphodiesterase PDE5 inhibitors (e.g., sildenafil, tadalafil, vardenafil, avanafil)
- Psychostimulants (stimulants) (e.g., amphetamine, methamphetamine, cocaine, mephedrone (4-MMC), metaphedrone (3-MMC), MDPV) – norepinephrine–dopamine releasing agents (NDRAs) and/or norepinephrine–dopamine reuptake inhibitors (NDRIs)
- Serotonergic psychedelics (e.g., 2C-B, 5-MeO-DiPT, 5-MeO-MiPT) – serotonin 5-HT_{2A} receptor agonists

== See also ==
- Lists of investigational drugs
