= TGFK-09SD =

Clinical data
- Other names: TGFK09SD
- Routes of administration: Oral
- Drug class: Serotonin 5-HT_{1A} receptor agonist
- ATC code: None

TGFK-09SD, or TGFK09SD, is a serotonin 5-HT_{1A} receptor agonist which is or was under development for the treatment of female sexual dysfunction but was never marketed. It is taken orally. The drug was developed by Fabre-Kramer Pharmaceuticals. As of January 2016, it is in phase 2 clinical trials. There have been no further updates on the development of the drug since then. The chemical structure of TGFK-09SD does not yet appear to have been disclosed.

== See also ==
- List of investigational sexual dysfunction drugs
