= Milton Packer =

American cardiologist

Milton Packer (b. ca 1951) is an American cardiologist who is known for his clinical research concerning heart failure.

== Early life and education ==
Milton Packer was born in the United States to Holocaust survivors who were saved from the Vilna Ghetto by Karl Plagge. He grew up in Philadelphia, where his father worked as a tailor. He was politically active in the 1960s.

He earned his undergraduate degree at Pennsylvania State University in 1971 and his medical degree from Jefferson Medical College in Philadelphia in 1973 when he was 22 years old. He completed his residency at Albert Einstein College of Medicine in New York City, where Edmund Sonnenblick was working, and a fellowship in cardiology at Mount Sinai School of Medicine in New York, where Richard Gorlin was conducting research.

== Academic career ==
In 1979 he was made an assistant professor at Mount Sinai, was promoted to associate professor in 1983, and was made a professor in 1988. In 1992 he moved to Columbia University and was made the Dickinson Richards Professor of Medicine. Columbia has recruited him with an invitation to build a clinical and research program in heart failure, and he in turn recruited faculty who had a strong interest in both; members of the group could come up with a hypothesis about heart failure while treating a patient, and that doctor or another member of the team would begin researching it the same day.

In 2004, he moved to University of Texas Southwestern Medical Center as a trailing spouse. He was offered a named professorship and the opportunity to set up a center within the college focused on teaching clinical research and supporting career development for doctors who wanted to pursue a career in clinical research. The center brought biostaticians, who had been in the public health department, together with physicians from many branches of medicine, with the goal of spreading the appreciation for rigorous statistical design of clinical research and making statistical expertise more widely available in the college. Packer earned an NIH Clinical and Translational Science Award in 2007 to support these efforts.

In 2015 he was appointed a distinguished scholar at the Baylor University Medical Center at Dallas.

== Research ==
Along with practicing cardiology, he spent the first part of his career doing small clinical research studies trying to better understand the pathology of heart failure.

In 1992 he published a paper on a neurohormonal hypothesis to explain heart failure that synthesized ideas that were percolating at the time; the paper made him known as the father of that idea.

In 1986 he joined the Cardiac and Renal Drugs Advisory Committee at the FDA, an event that he said was life-changing.

"The pivotal event for me was my appointment as a member of the cardiorenal advisory committee for the Food and Drug Administration. The Food and Drug Administration is the country's most valuable resource for clinical data, clinical research design, and clinical research analysis. The people who are there receive voluminous amounts of data about drugs in development and drugs already on the market and are challenged with how to find the "truth" in the data and how to translate that truth into decisions about public health. This is an unbelievably hard job and a terribly important responsibility. If the FDA makes a mistake, there is a potential for an enormous amount of suffering; if they do the right thing, there is a real opportunity for an enormous number of lives to be saved and the quality of lives to be improved. They have, within their community, developed clinical trial methodology to an unbelievably high standard, the highest standard in the world."

After this he started getting involved running large multi-center clinical trials for heart failure drugs, several of which were landmark studies in the care of heart failure.

He was principal investigator on the REFLECT trial for flosequinan which ran from 1987-1989 and the following PROFILE trial from 1991-1994. He was PI on a study of amlodipine that ran from 1987-1989 and the following PRAISE trial from 1992-1995 and PRAISE 2 from 1996-1999; the PROMISE trial for milrinone 1988-1990; the ATLAS trial for lisinopril from 1993-1997; the PRECISE trial for carvedilol from 1993-1995 and the following COPERNICUS trial from 1997-2002; the ENABLE trial (1999-2001) and REACH-1 trial (1997-2003) for bosentan; the OVERTURE trial (1999-2002) for omapatrilat; REVIVE I and II (2001-2006) for levosimendan; and the TRUE-AHF trial of ularitide that started in 2013. He also chaired the steering committee for the RADIANCE trial from 1989-1992 which studied the use of digoxin in people who were also treated with ACE inhibitors and chaired the steering committee for the RENEWAL trial (1999-2002) for etanercept. He was also the co-PI of the PARADIGM-HF trial that led to the approval of valsartan/sacubitril.

The PROFILE trial had negative results; it was terminated early in 1993 due to increased mortality in the drug arm of the trial. Packer was the lead author of the conference abstract in which topline results were presented. The abstract promised that data and analysis would be forthcoming in a future paper; as of 2001 no such paper had been published. Similarly, the REACH-1 trial had negative results and was terminated early, and the preliminary results were presented at a conference by Packer, with no full publication following as of 2001, leaving the field without insight into why the drug caused harm at the dosage given in that trial. Results of both trials were published in 2017, with an explanation about the delay.

The success of the PARADIGM-HF trial was a great satisfaction for him, as it validated the neurohormonal hypothesis; an earlier effort with omapatrilat had failed due to side effects caused by the drug candidate.

He was a founding member and former President of Heart Failure Society of America. His research on the treatment of heart failure led to him being awarded the Lewis Katz lifetime achievement award in cardiovascular research.
