= Orenetide =

Clinical data
- Trade names: Libicore (proposed), Desirix (proposed)
- Other names: BP101; BP-101; Thr-Lys-Pro-Arg-Pro; L-threonyl-L-lysyl-L-prolyl-L-arginyl-L-proline; "Female Viagra"
- Routes of administration: Intranasal (nasal spray)
- Drug class: Unknown

Identifiers
- IUPAC name: (2S)-1-[(2S)-2-[[(2S)-1-[(2S)-6-amino-2-[[(2S,3R)-2-amino-3-hydroxybutanoyl]amino]hexanoyl]pyrrolidine-2-carbonyl]amino]-5-(diaminomethylideneamino)pentanoyl]pyrrolidine-2-carboxylic acid
- CAS Number: 1124168-43-9
- PubChem CID: 71745112
- ChemSpider: 129309196
- UNII: FT35WF5AKQ

Chemical and physical data
- Formula: C_{26}H_{47}N_{9}O_{7}
- Molar mass: 597.718 g·mol^{−1}
- 3D model (JSmol): Interactive image
- SMILES: C[C@H]([C@@H](C(=O)N[C@@H](CCCCN)C(=O)N1CCC[C@H]1C(=O)N[C@@H](CCCN=C(N)N)C(=O)N2CCC[C@H]2C(=O)O)N)O
- InChI: InChI=1S/C26H47N9O7/c1-15(36)20(28)22(38)33-16(7-2-3-11-27)23(39)34-13-5-9-18(34)21(37)32-17(8-4-12-31-26(29)30)24(40)35-14-6-10-19(35)25(41)42/h15-20,36H,2-14,27-28H2,1H3,(H,32,37)(H,33,38)(H,41,42)(H4,29,30,31)/t15-,16+,17+,18+,19+,20+/m1/s1; Key:XHFIMNICAYXOAS-HLXURNFRSA-N

Orenetide (INN; developmental code name BP101, proposed brand names Libicore and Desirix), also known as Thr-Lys-Pro-Arg-Pro or as so-called "female Viagra", is a synthetic small peptide drug which is under development for the treatment of female sexual dysfunction, or more specifically hypoactive sexual desire disorder (HSDD). It is taken intranasally as a nasal spray.

The mechanism of action of orenetide has not been fully elucidated and is unknown. It was inactive at a panel of 98 G protein-coupled receptors (GPCRs), including serotonin, dopamine, and melanocortin receptors, among others. However, at high concentrations in vitro, it inhibited selected GABA_{A} receptors, which may be involved in its effects. Relatedly, it has been labeled in some sources as a "GABA_{A} receptor antagonist". The drug produces pro-sexual effects in rodents, with these effects appearing to be mediated in the medial preoptic area. It is described as a potential first-in-class medication.

The drug was originated by Ivix and is under development by Ovoca Bio. As of January 2021, it is in the preregistration phase of development. In August 2023, it was announced that orenetide had failed to show efficacy for sexual desire or sexual distress in a large dose-ranging phase 2 clinical trial for treatment of HSDD. Shares of Ovoca Bio fell by as much as 82% following the announcement. Ovoca Bio is Ireland-based and orenetide has been developed in Australia, New Zealand, and Russia. It reached phase 2 trials in Australia and New Zealand and completed phase 3 trials in Russia and was submitted for marketing approval in that country.

== See also ==
- List of investigational sexual dysfunction drugs
- List of Russian drugs
