= Bupropion/trazodone =

Combination of
- Bupropion: Norepinephrine–dopamine reuptake inhibitor (NDRI), other actions
- Trazodone: Serotonin antagonist and reuptake inhibitor (SARI), other actions

Clinical data
- Other names: Lorexys; Orexa; S1P-104; S1P-205; SIP-104; Trazodone/bupropion
- Routes of administration: Oral

Bupropion/trazodone (developmental code names S1P-104 and S1P-205; proposed brand names Lorexys and Orexa) is a combination of the norepinephrine–dopamine reuptake inhibitor (NDRI) bupropion and the serotonin antagonist and reuptake inhibitor (SARI) trazodone which is under development for the treatment of erectile dysfunction, female sexual dysfunction, and male sexual dysfunction. It is taken orally. Both bupropion and trazodone have individually been found to be effective and used for treating sexual dysfunction, such as low sexual desire or erectile dysfunction. Bupropion/trazodone is under development by S1 Pharmaceuticals or S1 Biopharma. As of September 2021, it is in phase 2 clinical trials for erectile dysfunction and female sexual dysfunction, whereas no recent development has been reported for male sexual dysfunction.

== See also ==
- List of investigational sexual dysfunction drugs
