= Deuterated testosterone =

Clinical data
- Other names: AVA-291; AVA291; d-Testosterone; d3-Testosterone; d3-T; Deutestosterone; Testosterone-19-d3; 17β-Hydroxyandrost-4-en-3-one-19,19,19-D3
- Routes of administration: Oral, transdermal, parenteral
- Drug class: Androgen; Anabolic steroid

Identifiers
- IUPAC name: (8R,9S,10R,13S,14S,17S)-17-hydroxy-13-methyl-10-(trideuteriomethyl)-1,2,6,7,8,9,11,12,14,15,16,17-dodecahydrocyclopenta[a]phenanthren-3-one
- CAS Number: 69660-28-2
- PubChem CID: 56619059
- ChemSpider: 129395050
- UNII: 6BBK8AP9G8

Chemical and physical data
- Formula: C_{19}H_{28}O_{2}
- Molar mass: 288.431 g·mol^{−1}
- 3D model (JSmol): Interactive image
- SMILES: [2H]C([2H])([2H])[C@]12CCC(=O)C=C1CC[C@@H]3[C@@H]2CC[C@]4([C@H]3CC[C@@H]4O)C
- InChI: InChI=1S/C19H28O2/c1-18-9-7-13(20)11-12(18)3-4-14-15-5-6-17(21)19(15,2)10-8-16(14)18/h11,14-17,21H,3-10H2,1-2H3/t14-,15-,16-,17-,18-,19-/m0/s1/i1D3; Key:MUMGGOZAMZWBJJ-RJSKNYPQSA-N

Deuterated testosterone (developmental code name AVA-291), also known as d3-testosterone (d3-T), is an androgen or androgen receptor agonist which is under development for the treatment of breast cancer, female sexual dysfunction, hypogonadism, decreased libido, fatigue, and muscular atrophy. It is taken orally, transdermally, or parenterally.

The drug is an isotopologue of testosterone. More specifically, the three hydrogen atoms on the C19 methyl group have been replaced with the deuterium isotopes. Unlike testosterone, deuterated testosterone is highly resistant to metabolism into estradiol by aromatase, showing a half-life that is 4 to 7 times longer than that of testosterone in an aromatase-containing system in vitro (55.9–79.9 minutes vs. 7.7–18.5 minutes, respectively). On the other hand, they were metabolized at similar rates in rat and human hepatocytes. In addition, deuterated testosterone had similar potency and efficacy as testosterone as an androgen receptor agonist in vitro. As such, deuterated testosterone is expected to retain activity as an androgen similarly to testosterone but to lack or have greatly reduced estrogenic activity. Accordingly, deuterated testosterone showed 1,000-fold lower potential in stimulating breast cancer cell proliferation compared to testosterone.

The chemical synthesis of deuterated testosterone has been described.

Deuterated testosterone was first described in the scientific literature by 1978. It is under development by Lennham Pharmaceuticals and Aviva Biopharm. As of December 2025, the drug is in the preclinical research stage of development. A phase 1 trial is being planned for early 2026. Deuterated testosterone was patented in 2021. It is expected to have improved tolerability and safety relative to testosterone in certain contexts, for instance avoiding gynecomastia (male breast development) or treating estrogen-sensitive breast cancer.

== See also ==
- List of investigational sex-hormonal agents
- List of investigational sexual dysfunction drugs
