= C19H26N2O4S =

The molecular formula C_{19}H_{26}N_{2}O_{4}S (molar mass: 378.49 g/mol, exact mass: 378.1613 u) may refer to:

- Gemopatrilat
- Zinterol
