= UK-447841 =

Clinical data
- Other names: UK447841; UK-447,841
- Routes of administration: Oral
- Drug class: Neprilysin inhibitor
- ATC code: None

Identifiers
- IUPAC name: (2S)-2-[[1-[3-(4-chlorophenyl)propylcarbamoyl]cyclopentyl]methyl]-4-methoxybutanoic acid
- CAS Number: 465528-01-2
- PubChem CID: 15978653
- ChemSpider: 13110134
- UNII: T76DLY464G
- ChEMBL: ChEMBL225085

Chemical and physical data
- Formula: C_{21}H_{30}ClNO_{4}
- Molar mass: 395.92 g·mol^{−1}
- 3D model (JSmol): Interactive image
- SMILES: COCC[C@H](CC1(CCCC1)C(=O)NCCCC2=CC=C(C=C2)Cl)C(=O)O
- InChI: InChI=1S/C21H30ClNO4/c1-27-14-10-17(19(24)25)15-21(11-2-3-12-21)20(26)23-13-4-5-16-6-8-18(22)9-7-16/h6-9,17H,2-5,10-15H2,1H3,(H,23,26)(H,24,25)/t17-/m1/s1; Key:UOGBJRPKRSUJRU-QGZVFWFLSA-N

UK-447841 is a neprilysin inhibitor (NEPI) which was under development for the treatment of female sexual dysfunction. It is taken as-needed orally. The drug is intended to work by inhibiting vasoactive intestinal peptide (VIP) hydrolysis by neprilysin (NEP). However, neprilysin is also involved in the metabolism of more than 50 other hormones and neuropeptides, for instance oxytocin among others. UK-447841 was under development by Pfizer. It reached phase 2 clinical trials prior to the discontinuation of its development in 2008.

== See also ==
- List of investigational sexual dysfunction drugs
