= C22H25NO5 =

The molecular formula C_{22}H_{25}NO_{5} (molar mass: 383.437 g/mol, exact mass: 383.1733 u) may refer to:

- Acetylpropionylmorphine
- Sacubitrilat
