= Buspirone/testosterone =

Combination drug

Combination of
- Buspirone: 5-HT_{1A} receptor agonist
- Testosterone: Androgen (AR agonist)

Clinical data
- Other names: Lybridos

Legal status
- Legal status: US: Investigational New Drug

Buspirone/testosterone (tentative brand name Lybridos) is a combination of buspirone, a 5-HT_{1A} receptor partial agonist, α_{2}-adrenergic receptor antagonist, and D_{2} autoreceptor antagonist, and testosterone, an androgen or androgen receptor agonist, which is under development by the pharmaceutical company Emotional Brain for the treatment of female sexual dysfunction. Both buspirone and testosterone have individually been found to be effective in the treatment of female sexual dysfunction in clinical studies, and so their combination could be anticipated to be even more effective. As of January 2016, the combination is in phase II clinical trials, with a phase III trial being planned in the United States and Europe.

== See also ==
- List of investigational sexual dysfunction drugs
- Bremelanotide
- Flibanserin
- Intrinsa
