= Barusiban =

Chemical compound

Clinical data
- Drug class: Oxytocin receptor antagonist
- ATC code: None

Identifiers
- IUPAC name: (4S,7S,10S,13S,16R)-N-[(2S)-5-Amino-1-hydroxy-2-pentanyl]-7-(2-amino-2-oxoethyl)-10-[(2R)-2-butanyl]-13-sec-butyl-16-(1H-indol-3-ylmethyl)-N-methyl-6,9,12,15,18-pentaoxo-1-thia-5,8,11,14,17-pentaazacycloicosane-4-carboxamide
- CAS Number: 285571-64-4
- PubChem CID: 9832431
- ChemSpider: 8008159
- UNII: UX33I93GLS
- CompTox Dashboard (EPA): DTXSID20182771

Chemical and physical data
- Formula: C_{40}H_{63}N_{9}O_{8}S
- Molar mass: 830.06 g·mol^{−1}
- 3D model (JSmol): Interactive image
- SMILES: CC[C@H](C)[C@H]1C(=O)N[C@H](C(=O)N[C@H](C(=O)N[C@@H](CCSCCC(=O)N[C@@H](C(=O)N1)CC2=CNC3=CC=CC=C32)C(=O)N(C)[C@@H](CCCN)CO)CC(=O)N)[C@H](C)CC
- InChI: InChI=1S/C40H63N9O8S/c1-6-23(3)34-38(55)46-31(20-32(42)51)36(53)45-29(40(57)49(5)26(22-50)11-10-16-41)14-17-58-18-15-33(52)44-30(19-25-21-43-28-13-9-8-12-27(25)28)37(54)47-35(24(4)7-2)39(56)48-34/h8-9,12-13,21,23-24,26,29-31,34-35,43,50H,6-7,10-11,14-20,22,41H2,1-5H3,(H2,42,51)(H,44,52)(H,45,53)(H,46,55)(H,47,54)(H,48,56)/t23-,24+,26+,29+,30-,31+,34+,35+/m1/s1; Key:UGNGRKKDUVKQDF-IHOMMZCZSA-N

Barusiban (INN; development code FE-200440) is a peptide drug which is among the most potent and selective oxytocin receptor antagonists known. It was trialed by Ferring Pharmaceuticals as a treatment of preterm labor but failed to demonstrate effectiveness and was not pursued any further.

== See also ==
- Oxytocin receptor antagonist
- Atosiban
- Epelsiban
- L-368,899
- L-371,257
- Retosiban
