= Omapatrilat =

Chemical compound

Clinical data
- Other names: BMS-186716
- ATC code: None

Legal status
- Legal status: Development terminated

Identifiers
- IUPAC name: (4S,7S,10aS)-Octahydro-4-[(S)-α-mercaptohydrocinnamamido]-5-oxo-7H-pyrido[2,1-b][1,3]thiazepine-7-carboxylic acid
- CAS Number: 167305-00-2
- PubChem CID: 656629
- ChemSpider: 570983
- UNII: 36NLI90E7T
- KEGG: D01970
- ChEMBL: ChEMBL289556
- CompTox Dashboard (EPA): DTXSID80168273

Chemical and physical data
- Formula: C_{19}H_{24}N_{2}O_{4}S_{2}
- Molar mass: 408.53 g·mol^{−1}
- 3D model (JSmol): Interactive image
- SMILES: c1ccc(cc1)C[C@@H](C(=O)N[C@H]2CCS[C@H]3CCC[C@H](N3C2=O)C(=O)O)S
- InChI: InChI=1S/C19H24N2O4S2/c22-17(15(26)11-12-5-2-1-3-6-12)20-13-9-10-27-16-8-4-7-14(19(24)25)21(16)18(13)23/h1-3,5-6,13-16,26H,4,7-11H2,(H,20,22)(H,24,25)/t13-,14-,15-,16-/m0/s1; Key:LVRLSYPNFFBYCZ-VGWMRTNUSA-N

Omapatrilat (INN, proposed trade name Vanlev) is an experimental antihypertensive agent that was never marketed. It inhibits both neprilysin (neutral endopeptidase, NEP) and angiotensin-converting enzyme (ACE). NEP inhibition results in elevated natriuretic peptide levels, promoting natriuresis, diuresis, vasodilation, and reductions in preload and ventricular remodeling.

It was discovered and developed by Bristol-Myers Squibb but failed in clinical trials as a potential treatment for congestive heart failure due to safety concerns about its causing angioedema.

Omapatrilat angioedema was attributed to its dual mechanism of action, inhibiting both angiotensin-converting enzyme (ACE), and neprilysin (neutral endopeptidase), both of these enzymes are responsible for the metabolism of bradykinin which causes vasodilation, angioedema, and airway obstruction.

== See also ==
- Gemopatrilat
- Cilazapril
- Sacubitril
