= Flosequinan =

Chemical compound

Clinical data
- ATC code: C01DB01 (WHO)

Identifiers
- IUPAC name: (RS)-7-fluoro-3-methanesulfinyl-1-methyl-1,4-dihydroquinolin-4-one
- CAS Number: 76568-02-0
- PubChem CID: 4474062
- ChemSpider: 3672315
- UNII: 6NB119DLU7
- KEGG: D04195
- CompTox Dashboard (EPA): DTXSID1048833

Chemical and physical data
- Formula: C_{11}H_{10}FNO_{2}S
- Molar mass: 239.26 g·mol^{−1}
- 3D model (JSmol): Interactive image
- SMILES: CN1C=C(C(=O)C2=C1C=C(C=C2)F)S(=O)C
- InChI: InChI=1S/C11H10FNO2S/c1-13-6-10(16(2)15)11(14)8-4-3-7(12)5-9(8)13/h3-6H,1-2H3; Key:UYGONJYYUKVHDD-UHFFFAOYSA-N

Flosequinan is a quinolone vasodilator that was discovered and developed by Boots UK and was sold for about a year under the trade name Manoplax. It had been approved in 1992 in the US and UK to treat people with heart failure who could not tolerate ACE inhibitors or digitalis.

Boots initiated a clinical trial called PROFILE to see if the drug could be useful in a wider population. The study was terminated early in 1993 due to increased mortality in the drug arm of the trial; preliminary results were published in a conference abstract by the PI Milton Packer and others, which promised data and analysis would be forthcoming in a future paper, which was finally published in 2017.

Boots withdrew it from the market in July 1993.
