= Mondobiotech =

- Type: Public
- Industry: Pharmaceutical
- Founded: 2000
- Defunct: 2016
- Successor: Relief Therapeutics
- Headquarters: Stans, Switzerland

Mondobiotech (styled mondoBIOTECH) was a Swiss biotechnology company focused on identifying potential treatments for rare diseases. Founded in 2001, it developed drug candidates by examining existing research on human peptides and other biological substances, and sought partners to conduct further development and licensing. Its holding company listed shares on the SIX Swiss Exchange in 2009. The holding company changed its name to THERAMetrics in 2013 and completed a combination with Pierrel Research International later that year; following a further business combination, it became Relief Therapeutics Holding AG in 2016.

== History ==
Fabio Cavalli founded the business in 2001 with his wife Vera and two partners. The company initially operated privately; the holding company was established in March 2007.

In July 2010, Ruggero Gramatica succeeded Cavalli as chief executive, while Cavalli became executive chairman. Cavalli did not stand for re-election to the board in May 2011.

== Research and partnerships ==
Mondobiotech investigated whether information already published about naturally occurring human substances could suggest new uses in rare diseases. A 2010 case study by researchers at the University of St. Gallen described its use of scientific literature, external researchers and laboratories, and licensing partners instead of maintaining a conventional in-house laboratory operation. Financial news reporting also described the company's approach as searching medical databases for drug candidates and licensing rights to other companies.

In 2002, Mondobiotech and InterMune agreed to collaborate on interferon gamma-1b research for pulmonary diseases, including asthma; the arrangement also covered specified patent rights relating to idiopathic pulmonary fibrosis. In 2006, Biogen Idec licensed rights to develop aviptadil for pulmonary arterial hypertension. The agreement included a US$7.5 million upfront payment and up to US$30 million in possible development and commercialization milestones; the milestone amount was conditional, not a payment already received. Biogen stated in a later regulatory filing that it ended its participation in the aviptadil development program in December 2009. In February 2010, Mondobiotech entered a partnership with Lung Rx, a subsidiary of United Therapeutics, for further development of aviptadil. The company also agreed in 2009 to have Bachem develop and manufacture peptides for its research programs.

== Stock exchange listing and later history ==
Mondobiotech's common shares began trading on the SIX Swiss Exchange on 26 August 2009 under the symbol RARE. The first day's closing price was CHF 392. SIX records a market capitalization of approximately CHF 490 million in its historical listing data. In its account of the listing, the Swiss business magazine BILANZ reported an implied value of approximately CHF 2.6 billion for the entire company at the first-day closing price, noting that only a small number of shares had traded that day. No new shares were issued as part of the initial listing.

BILANZ reported in 2011 that the company had accumulated losses and had not yet brought a medicine to market. Mondobiotech changed its name to THERAMetrics in June 2013 and completed its combination with Pierrel Research International in September 2013. THERAMetrics subsequently combined with Relief Therapeutics SA and changed its corporate name to Relief Therapeutics Holding AG in July 2016.

== Recognition ==
Mondobiotech received the 2005 Swiss Life Sciences Prize and was included on the World Economic Forum's list of Technology Pioneers for 2008. Cavalli received the 2006 Ernst & Young Entrepreneur of the Year award in Switzerland in the start-up category for Mondobiotech.

== See also ==
- List of pharmaceutical companies
- Pharmaceutical industry in Switzerland
