= L-368,899 =

Chemical compound

Clinical data
- ATC code: None

Identifiers
- IUPAC name: (S)-2-amino-N-((1S,2S,4R)-7,7-dimethyl-1-((4-o-tolylpiperazin-1-ylsulfonyl)methyl)bicyclo[2.2.1]heptan-2-yl)-4-(methylsulfonyl)butanamide
- CAS Number: 148927-60-0
- PubChem CID: 132857
- IUPHAR/BPS: 2249
- ChemSpider: 8048078
- UNII: ER33G946JT
- ChEMBL: ChEMBL1253853
- CompTox Dashboard (EPA): DTXSID80933504

Chemical and physical data
- Formula: C_{26}H_{42}N_{4}O_{5}S_{2}
- Molar mass: 554.77 g·mol^{−1}
- 3D model (JSmol): Interactive image
- SMILES: CC1(C)[C@@]2(CS(N3CCN(C4=CC=CC=C4C)CC3)(=O)=O)CC[C@@H]1C[C@@H]2NC([C@H](CCS(C)(=O)=O)N)=O

L-368,899 is a drug used in scientific research which acts as a selective antagonist of the oxytocin receptor, with good selectivity over the related vasopressin receptors. Unlike related drugs such as the peripherally selective L-371,257, the oral bioavailabity is high and the brain penetration of L-368,899 is rapid, with selective accumulation in areas of the limbic system. This makes it a useful tool for investigating the centrally mediated roles of oxytocin, such as in social behaviour and pair bonding, and studies in primates have shown L-368,899 to reduce a number of behaviours such as food sharing, sexual activity and caring for infants, demonstrating the importance of oxytocinergic signalling in mediating these important social behaviours.

== See also ==
- Oxytocin receptor antagonist
- Atosiban
- Barusiban
- Epelsiban
- L-371,257
- Retosiban
