= Cligosiban =

Clinical data
- Other names: IX-01; IX01; PF-3274167; PF3274167; PF-03274167; PF03274167; PF-327,4167
- Routes of administration: Oral
- Drug class: Oxytocin receptor antagonist

Pharmacokinetic data
- Elimination half-life: 12 hours

Identifiers
- IUPAC name: 5-[3-[3-(2-chloro-4-fluorophenoxy)azetidin-1-yl]-5-(methoxymethyl)-1,2,4-triazol-4-yl]-2-methoxypyridine
- CAS Number: 900510-03-4
- PubChem CID: 11683187
- DrugBank: DB20573
- UNII: D361S17AIF
- ChEMBL: ChEMBL594828

Chemical and physical data
- Formula: C_{19}H_{19}ClFN_{5}O_{3}
- Molar mass: 419.84 g·mol^{−1}
- 3D model (JSmol): Interactive image
- SMILES: COCC1=NN=C(N1C2=CN=C(C=C2)OC)N3CC(C3)OC4=C(C=C(C=C4)F)Cl
- InChI: InChI=1S/C19H19ClFN5O3/c1-27-11-17-23-24-19(26(17)13-4-6-18(28-2)22-8-13)25-9-14(10-25)29-16-5-3-12(21)7-15(16)20/h3-8,14H,9-11H2,1-2H3; Key:HNIFCPBQMKPRCX-UHFFFAOYSA-N

Cligosiban (INN; developmental code names IX-01 and PF-3274167) is an oxytocin receptor antagonist which is or was under development for the treatment of premature ejaculation. It is taken orally. The drug is a small molecule or non-peptide and is a potent, highly selective, and brain-penetrant antagonist of the oxytocin receptor. Cligosiban was originated by Pfizer and is under development by Ixchelsis and Chorus Group. As of December 2019, it is in phase 2 clinical trials. However, another source lists the drug's development as having been discontinued. The drug failed to show effectiveness in a phase 2b trial.

== See also ==
- List of investigational sexual dysfunction drugs
- Epelsiban
