= Libiguin A =

Clinical data
- Drug class: Pro-sexual agent
- ATC code: None

Identifiers
- IUPAC name: [(1S,4R,5R,9S,10R,12R,14R,15S,16S,17R,18S,19S)-4-(furan-3-carbonyl)-18-(2-methoxy-2-oxoethyl)-4,12,17,19-tetramethyl-15-(2-methylpropanoyloxy)-7-oxo-8,11,13,20-tetraoxaheptacyclo[10.7.1.1^{14,17}.0^{1,10}.0^{5,10}.0^{9,15}.0^{14,19}]henicosan-16-yl] 2-methylpropanoate
- CAS Number: 1088920-40-4
- PubChem CID: 178887307

Chemical and physical data
- Formula: C_{37}H_{46}O_{13}
- Molar mass: 698.762 g·mol^{−1}
- 3D model (JSmol): Interactive image
- SMILES: CC(C)C(=O)O[C@H]1[C@@]2(C[C@]34[C@]1([C@@H]5[C@]67[C@H](CC(=O)O5)[C@](CC[C@@]6([C@@]3([C@H]2CC(=O)OC)C)O[C@](O4)(O7)C)(C)C(=O)C8=COC=C8)OC(=O)C(C)C)C
- InChI: InChI=1S/C37H46O13/c1-18(2)26(41)46-28-31(6)17-35-32(7,21(31)14-23(38)43-9)34-12-11-30(5,25(40)20-10-13-44-16-20)22-15-24(39)45-29(37(28,35)47-27(42)19(3)4)36(22,34)50-33(8,48-34)49-35/h10,13,16,18-19,21-22,28-29H,11-12,14-15,17H2,1-9H3/t21-,22+,28-,29-,30+,31+,32-,33+,34-,35+,36+,37-/m0/s1; Key:BFLOIRXWKQQOAJ-LDRQOQGOSA-N

Libiguin A is a naturally occurring limonoid found in Neobeguea mahafalensis, a flowering plant found in Madagascar with a long history of traditional medical use. It is a derivative of phragmalin. The compound has been reported to produce highly potent, strong, and long-lasting pro-sexual effects in rodents. The semisynthesis of libiguin A from phragmalin has been described. An analogue also found in Neobeguea mahafalensis, libiguin B, has similar pro-sexual effects but is far less potent in comparison. Another analogue, a synthetic compound known as volufralin (LIB-01; DIC-2024), is under development for the treatment of erectile dysfunction and premature ejaculation. Libiguin A was first described in the scientific literature by 2014.

== See also ==
- Volufralin
