= MMEL1 =

Protein-coding gene in humans

Identifiers
- Aliases: MMEL1, MMEL2, NEP2, NEPII, NL1, NL2, SEP, membrane metallo-endopeptidase-like 1, membrane metalloendopeptidase like 1
- External IDs: OMIM: 618104; MGI: 1351603; GeneCards: MMEL1
Enzyme activity
EC #	BRENDA	ExPASy	KEGG	MetaCyc
3.4.24.11	↗	↗	↗	↗

Gene location (Human)
Chr.	Chromosome 1 (human)
Band	1p36.32	Start	2,590,639 bp
Band	1p36.32	End	2,633,016 bp

Gene location (Mouse)
Chr.	Chromosome 4 (mouse)
Band	4|4 E2	Start	154,954,042 bp
Band	4|4 E2	End	154,979,985 bp
RNA expression pattern
Bgee	Human / Mouse (ortholog); Top expressed in: testicle; gonad; left testis; right testis; mucosa of transverse colon; right uterine tube; body of stomach; duodenum; right lung; fundus / Top expressed in: spermatid; seminiferous tubule; spermatocyte; embryo; embryo; neural layer of retina; blastocyst; facial motor nucleus; epiblast; cerebellar cortex; More reference expression data
BioGPS	n/a
Gene ontology
Molecular function	peptidase activity; metalloendopeptidase activity; hydrolase activity; metallopeptidase activity; metal ion binding; endopeptidase activity
Cellular component	integral component of membrane; extracellular region; membrane; extracellular space
Biological process	proteolysis
Sources:Amigo / QuickGO
Orthologs
Databases	NCBI: entry; OMA: entry
Species	Human	Mouse
Entrez	79258	27390
Ensembl	ENSG00000142606; ENSG00000277131	ENSMUSG00000058183
UniProt	Q495T6	Q9JLI3
RefSeq (mRNA)	NM_033467	NM_013783
RefSeq (protein)	NP_258428	NP_038811
Location (UCSC)	Chr 1: 2.59 – 2.63 Mb	Chr 4: 154.95 – 154.98 Mb
PubMed search
- Wikidata
View/Edit Human	View/Edit Mouse

Membrane metallo-endopeptidase-like 1 is a protein that in humans is encoded by the MMEL1 gene.

== Function ==
The protein encoded by this gene is a member of the neutral endopeptidase (NEP) or membrane metallo-endopeptidase (MME) family. Family members play important roles in pain perception, arterial pressure regulation, phosphate metabolism and homeostasis. This protein is a type II transmembrane protein and is thought to be expressed as a secreted protein. This gene is expressed mainly in testis with weak expression in the brain, kidney, and heart.
