= Clomipramine/sildenafil =

Combination of
- Clomipramine: Tricyclic antidepressant (TCA), serotonin–norepinephrine reuptake inhibitor (SNRI), other actions
- Sildenafil: Phosphodiesterase PDE5 inhibitor

Clinical data
- Other names: CDFR-0812; CDFR0812
- Routes of administration: Oral

Clomipramine/sildenafil (developmental code name CDFR-0812) is a combination of the tricyclic antidepressant (TCA) and serotonin–norepinephrine reuptake inhibitor (SNRI) clomipramine and the phosphodiesterase PDE5 inhibitor and erectile dysfunction drug sildenafil which is under development for the on-demand treatment of premature ejaculation. It is taken orally. The drug is under development by CTCBIO. As of October 2025, it is in phase 3 clinical trials in South Korea.

== See also ==
- List of investigational sexual dysfunction drugs
