= RO-0282425 =

Clinical data
- Other names: RO0282425
- Routes of administration: Unspecified
- Drug class: Melanocortin MC_{4} receptor agonist
- ATC code: None

RO-0282425 is a melanocortin MC_{4} receptor agonist which was under development for the treatment of erectile dysfunction but was never marketed. Its route of administration was unspecified. The drug was under development by Roche. It reached phase 2 clinical trials by 2005 but its development was subsequently discontinued. The chemical structure of RO-0282425, and whether it is a small molecule or a peptide, do not appear to have been disclosed.

== See also ==
- List of investigational sexual dysfunction drugs
