= L-371,257 =

Chemical compound

Clinical data
- Routes of administration: By mouth
- ATC code: None

Identifiers
- IUPAC name: 1-[4-[(1-Acetyl-4-piperidinyl)oxy]-2-methoxybenzoyl]-4-(2-oxo-2H-3,1-benzoxazin-1(4H)-yl)piperidine
- CAS Number: 162042-44-6
- PubChem CID: 6918320
- IUPHAR/BPS: 2252
- ChemSpider: 5293524
- UNII: 98KJ8P9APP
- ChEMBL: ChEMBL24781
- CompTox Dashboard (EPA): DTXSID30426072

Chemical and physical data
- Formula: C_{28}H_{33}N_{3}O_{6}
- Molar mass: 507.587 g·mol^{−1}
- 3D model (JSmol): Interactive image
- SMILES: O=C1OCc3ccccc3N1C(CC4)CCN4C(=O)c2ccc(cc2OC)OC5CCN(C(C)=O)CC5
- InChI: InChI=1S/C28H33N3O6/c1-19(32)29-15-11-22(12-16-29)37-23-7-8-24(26(17-23)35-2)27(33)30-13-9-21(10-14-30)31-25-6-4-3-5-20(25)18-36-28(31)34/h3-8,17,21-22H,9-16,18H2,1-2H3; Key:WDERJSQJYIJOPD-UHFFFAOYSA-N

L-371,257 is a compound used in scientific research which acts as a selective antagonist of the oxytocin receptor with over 800x selectivity over the related vasopressin receptors. It was one of the first non-peptide oxytocin antagonists developed, and has good oral bioavailability, but poor penetration of the blood–brain barrier, which gives it good peripheral selectivity with few central side effects. Potential applications are likely to be in the treatment of premature labour.

== See also ==
- Oxytocin receptor antagonist
- Atosiban
- Barusiban
- Epelsiban
- L-368,899
- Retosiban
