= Volufralin =

Clinical data
- Other names: LIB-01; LIB01; DIC-2024; DIC2024; Libiguin
- Routes of administration: Oral
- Drug class: Indirect melanocortin MC_{4} receptor potentiator

Pharmacokinetic data
- Onset of action: 15–120 min (T_{max})
- Elimination half-life: ≪12 hours

Identifiers
- IUPAC name: (1R,3aS,3a^{1}R,5S,6aR,8R,9S,9aS,9bR,12aR,13S,14R)-1-(furan-3-carbonyl)-9a-hydroxy-13-(2-methoxy-2-oxoethyl)-1,5,8,14-tetramethyl-11-oxododecahydro-5H-3a,6a,8-(epiethane[1,1,2]triyl)-3a^{1},5-epoxycyclopenta[d]pyrano[2,3,4-fg][1,3]benzodioxocin-9-yl 2-methylpropanoate
- CAS Number: 1088920-71-1

Chemical and physical data
- Formula: C_{33}H_{40}O_{12}
- Molar mass: 628.671 g·mol^{−1}

Volufralin (INN; developmental code names LIB-01, DIC-2024, and Libiguin) is an indirect melanocortin MC_{4} receptor potentiator which is under development for the treatment of erectile dysfunction and premature ejaculation. It is taken orally.

== Pharmacology ==
Volufralin works by increasing expression of the melanocortin MC_{4} receptor and of its endogenous agonist in the brain. In relation to this, its mechanism of action differs from that of earlier direct melanocortin receptor agonists like bremelanotide. As such, the drug is described as a potential first-in-class medication. Volufralin produces non-acute long-lasting pro-erectile effects in rodents and humans, with short-term dosing resulting in gradually increasing improvement that is then sustained for weeks despite cessation of dosing. The pro-erectile effects of volufralin can be reversed by a melanocortin MC_{4} receptor antagonist in rodents.

== Chemistry ==
Volufralin is a semisynthetic analogue of limonoids from Neobeguea mahafalensis root bark such as libiguin A and libiguin B. Neobeguea mahafalensis has a long history of traditional use in Madagascar. In 2014, libiguin A and B were discovered via isolation from the roots of the plant and were found to cause "profound enhancement of sexual activity" in rodents. This specifically included having very high potency and a remarkably long-lasting duration in increasing mounting behavior in male rodents.

== History ==
Volufralin was originated by Uppsala University in Sweden and is under development by Dicot Pharma. As of July 2026, it is in phase 2 clinical trials for erectile dysfunction and the preclinical research stage of development for premature ejaculation. The mechanism of action of the drug of indirect melanocortin MC_{4} receptor potentiation was not initially disclosed, but was announced by its developer in December 2025. The exact chemical structure of volufralin was not initially disclosed, aside from it being related to the libiguins. However, in July 2026, the generic name of volufralin and its structure were published.

== See also ==
- List of investigational sexual dysfunction drugs
- Libiguin A
