= Delequamine =

Abandoned α2-adrenoceptor antagonist

Clinical data
- Other names: DMMIN; RS-15385; RS 15385; RS15385; RS 15385-197; RS-15385-197; RS15385-197
- Drug class: α_{2}-Adrenergic receptor antagonist

Identifiers
- IUPAC name: (8aR,12aS,13aS)-3-methoxy-12-methylsulfonyl-5,6,8,8a,9,10,11,12a,13,13a-decahydroisoquinolino[2,1-g][1,6]naphthyridine
- CAS Number: 119813-87-5 119905-05-4
- PubChem CID: 60713
- ChemSpider: 54718
- UNII: L37HF85G8S
- ChEMBL: ChEMBL163911
- CompTox Dashboard (EPA): DTXSID301350815

Chemical and physical data
- Formula: C_{18}H_{26}N_{2}O_{3}S
- Molar mass: 350.48 g·mol^{−1}
- 3D model (JSmol): Interactive image
- SMILES: COC1=CC2=C(C=C1)[C@@H]3C[C@H]4[C@H](CCCN4S(=O)(=O)C)CN3CC2
- InChI: InChI=1S/C18H26N2O3S/c1-23-15-5-6-16-13(10-15)7-9-19-12-14-4-3-8-20(24(2,21)22)17(14)11-18(16)19/h5-6,10,14,17-18H,3-4,7-9,11-12H2,1-2H3/t14-,17+,18+/m1/s1; Key:JKDBLHWERQWYKF-JLSDUUJJSA-N

Delequamine (INN; developmental code names RS-15385, RS-15385-197) is a potent and selective α_{2}-adrenergic receptor antagonist which was under development for the treatment of erectile dysfunction and major depressive disorder but was never marketed.

It is structurally related to the naturally occurring α_{2}-adrenergic receptor antagonist yohimbine but has greater selectivity in comparison. The drug has been found to affect sexual function and sleep in humans.

Delequamine reached phase 3 clinical trials prior to the discontinuation of its development. The drug was under development in the 1990s and its development was discontinued by 1999. It was first described in the scientific literature by 1990.

== See also ==
- List of investigational antidepressants
- List of investigational sexual dysfunction drugs
