= Relief Therapeutics =

Swiss biopharmaceutical company

- Type: Public
- Industry: Biopharmaceutical
- Founded: 2013
- Headquarters: Geneva, Switzerland
- Key people: Raghuram Selvaraju (Chairman); Jack Weinstein (Chief Financial Officer)
- Products: RLF-100; ACER-001; PKU GOLIKE; Sentinox; Nexodyn
- Website: relieftherapeutics.com

Relief Therapeutics is a Swiss biopharmaceutical company based in Geneva. The company focuses on developing drugs for serious diseases with few or no existing treatment options. Its lead compound, RLF-100, is a synthetic form of a natural peptide that protects the lung. The company was incorporated as Relief Therapeutics Holdings AG (RFLB.S) and listed on the SIX Swiss Exchange in 2016.

== History ==
Relief Therapeutics was founded in 2013 by Gael Hédou with the aim of developing new treatments for diseases with high unmet needs. The company today considers itself the successor to Mondobiotech, which was founded in 2000 by Fabio Cavalli and Dorian Bevec. Mondobiotech began research into Vasoactive intestinal peptide (VIP), a naturally occurring substance in humans that was first identified in the 1970s. They were granted US and European patents for a synthetic version of VIP known as aviptadil in 2006.

On June 23, 2013, Mondobiotech merged with Italian pharmaceutical company Pierrel Research International to form a new Contract research organization known as Therametrics. On July 14, 2016, Therametrics merged with Relief Therapeutics to form Relief Therapeutics Holdings AG, which inherited all patents related to aviptadil.

== COVID-19 research ==
=== Aviptadil ===
In the wake of the COVID-19 pandemic, scientists at Relief conducted initial studies into the efficacy of RLF-100 in treating severe COVID-19 patients. In June 2020, the U.S. Food and Drug Administration granted fast-track designation to RLF-100 for treatment of respiratory distress in COVID-19. In September 2020, Relief partnered with US-Israeli firm NRX Pharmaceuticals (formerly NeuroRx Inc) for the co-development of the drug and the co-ordination of US trials. In April 2021, a reformulated version of aviptadil, known as Zyesami, was included in a National Institutes of Health (NIH) sponsored Phase 3 trial with the aim of testing aviptadil against remdesivir. In May 2021, NRX submitted a request for an Emergency Use Authorization (EUA) to the US FDA for aviptadil's use in patients in intensive care. On 7 October 2021 Relief Therapeutics filed a lawsuit against NRX Pharmaceuticals and its CEO Dr. Jonathan Javitt in the Supreme Court of the State of New York, citing multiple alleged breaches of the collaboration agreement signed by the two companies for the co-development of aviptadil.

On 4 November 2021 the FDA declined EUA for the drug, but committed to working with NRX to further develop it. On 29 November 2021, NRX announced that data analysis from the NIH-sponsored Phase 3 trial showed a fourfold increase in survival at 60 days for patients administered with Zyesami (Aviptadil) vs those who received placebo.

=== Sentinox ===
On 27 October 2021, Applied Pharma Research (APR), a wholly owned subsidiary of Relief, announced positive interim data from its clinical trial of Sentinox, a nasal spray aimed at reducing the viral load of patients with COVID-19, in-turn reducing the transmissibility of the virus.

== Other research ==
In October 2021, Relief announced that its collaboration partner, Texas-based Acer Therapeutics, had successfully filed for a New Drug Application with US FDA for their drug ACER-001, for the treatment of Urea Cycle Disorders (UCDs) and Maple syrup urine disease.

In September 2021, APR launched a chewable tablet for the treatment of Phenylketonuria, called PKU GOLIKE KRUNCH, in Germany and Italy. APR are also developing Nexodyn, a drug which aids in the management of hard-to-heal ulcers requiring long periods of treatment.

Relief is actively developing RLF-100 for non-COVID-19 related acute and chronic lung diseases, such as Pulmonary sarcoidosis.

== Acquisitions ==
- In July 2016, Relief acquired FirstString Research, a clinical-stage biotech firm based in Charleston, South Carolina, US.
- In January 2021, Relief acquired German-based firm AdVita in a €25 million agreement to further their research into inhaled treatments for Acute respiratory distress syndrome.
- In May 2021, Relief acquired Swiss biotech firm Applied Pharma Research (APR), including its existing portfolio and all pipeline products, for CHF 72 million ($79 million).
