= Sacubitril =

Chemical compound

Clinical data
- Other names: AHU-377
- License data: EU EMA: by INN
- ATC code: C09DX04 (WHO) (combination with valsartan)

Identifiers
- IUPAC name: 4-{[(2S,4R)-1-(4-Biphenylyl)-5-ethoxy-4-methyl-5-oxo-2-pentanyl]amino}-4-oxobutanoic acid
- CAS Number: 149709-62-6
- PubChem CID: 9811834
- DrugBank: DB09292
- ChemSpider: 7987587
- UNII: 17ERJ0MKGI
- KEGG: D10225
- CompTox Dashboard (EPA): DTXSID20164370

Chemical and physical data
- Formula: C_{24}H_{29}NO_{5}
- Molar mass: 411.498 g·mol^{−1}
- 3D model (JSmol): Interactive image
- SMILES: CCOC(=O)[C@H](C)C[C@@H](Cc1ccc(-c2ccccc2)cc1)NC(=O)CCC(=O)O
- InChI: InChI=1S/C24H29NO5/c1-3-30-24(29)17(2)15-21(25-22(26)13-14-23(27)28)16-18-9-11-20(12-10-18)19-7-5-4-6-8-19/h4-12,17,21H,3,13-16H2,1-2H3,(H,25,26)(H,27,28)/t17-,21+/m1/s1; Key:PYNXFZCZUAOOQC-UTKZUKDTSA-N

Sacubitril (/səˈkjuːbɪtrɪl/; INN) is an antihypertensive drug used in combination with valsartan. The combination drug sacubitril/valsartan, known during trials as LCZ696 and marketed under the brand name Entresto, is a treatment for heart failure. It was approved under the FDA's priority review process for use in heart failure on July 7, 2015.

== Side effects ==
Sacubitril increases levels of bradykinin, which is responsible for the edema seen sometimes in patients with the medication. This is why the medication is not recommended for patients with a history of pulmonary edema with the usage of ACE inhibitors.

== Mechanism of action ==
Sacubitril is a prodrug that is activated to sacubitrilat (LBQ657) by de-ethylation via esterases. Sacubitrilat inhibits the enzyme neprilysin, which is responsible for the degradation of atrial and brain natriuretic peptide, two blood pressure–lowering peptides that work mainly by reducing blood volume. In addition, neprilysin degrades a variety of peptides including bradykinin, an inflammatory mediator.

Sacubitril activation to sacubitrilat

== Synthesis ==
The large scale synthesis of sacubritil begins with 4-bromo-1,1'-biphenyl, which is converted to its corresponding Grignard reagent; this is reacted directly with (S)-epichlorohydrin regioselectively at less-substituted site of the epoxide.

A Mitsunobu reaction with succinimide is performed, followed by acidic hydrolysis of the succinimide protecting group, hydrolysis of the alkyl chloride using sodium hydroxide and protection of the free amine with a tert-butoxycarbonyl (Boc) group. The primary alcohol is oxidized using bleach with TEMPO as the catalyst. This aldehyde undergoes a Wittig reaction to for the α.β-unsaturated ester, which is converted to the lithium carboxylate by hydrolysis using lithium hydroxide in aqueous ethanol. Asymmetric hydrogenation using a ruthenium catalyst and a chiral bisphosphine ligand sets the second stereocenter. The carboxylate is esterified by reaction with thionyl chloride to form the acyl chloride, which is reacted with ethanol. The acidic conditions under which the acyl chloride is generated result in removal of the Boc group, which allows for direct reaction of the amine with succinic anhydride in the presence of pyridine as a base.

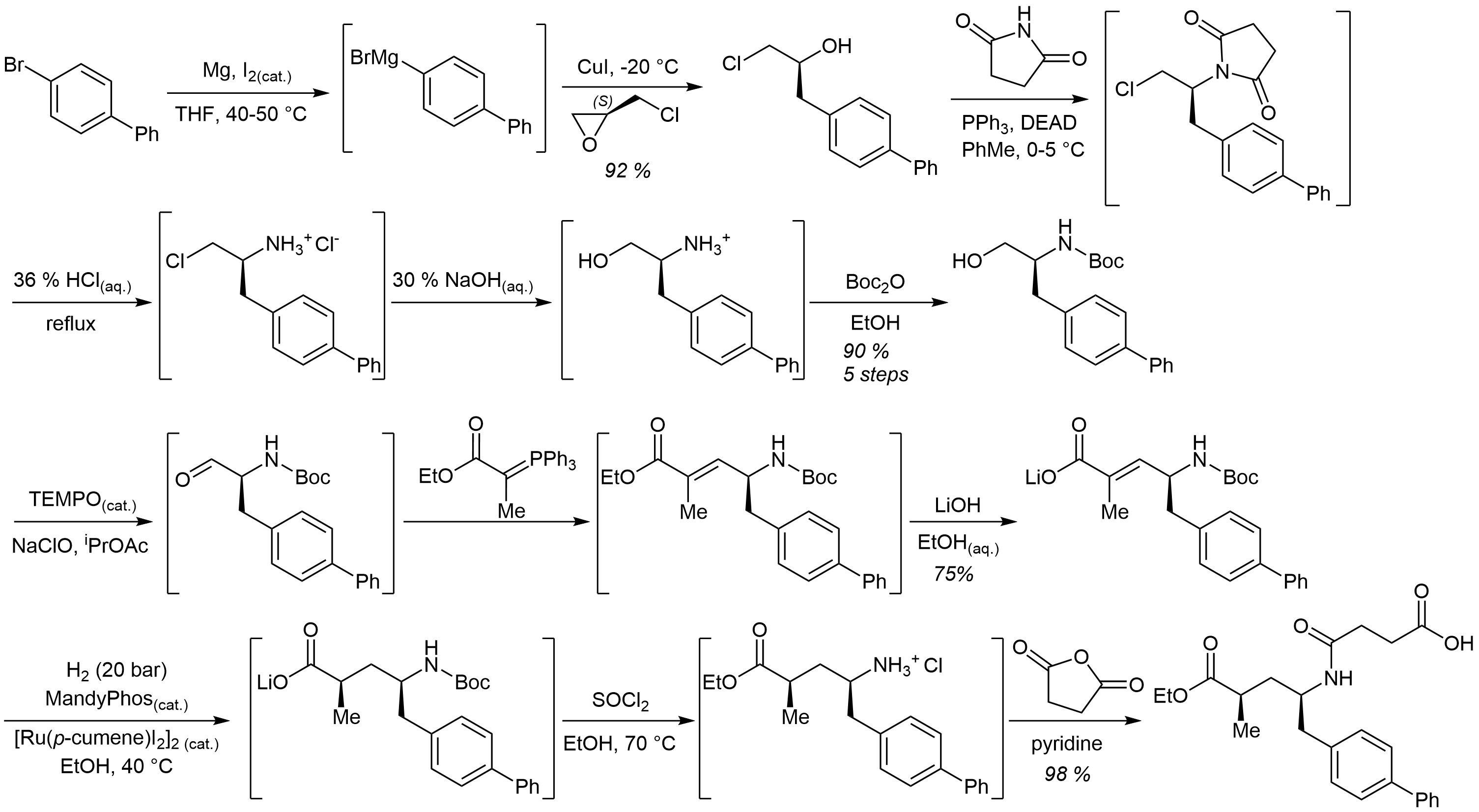
Industrial scale synthetic route to sacubitril

== See also ==
- Omapatrilat
