= Aviptadil =

Synthetic vasoactive intestinal peptide

aviptadil
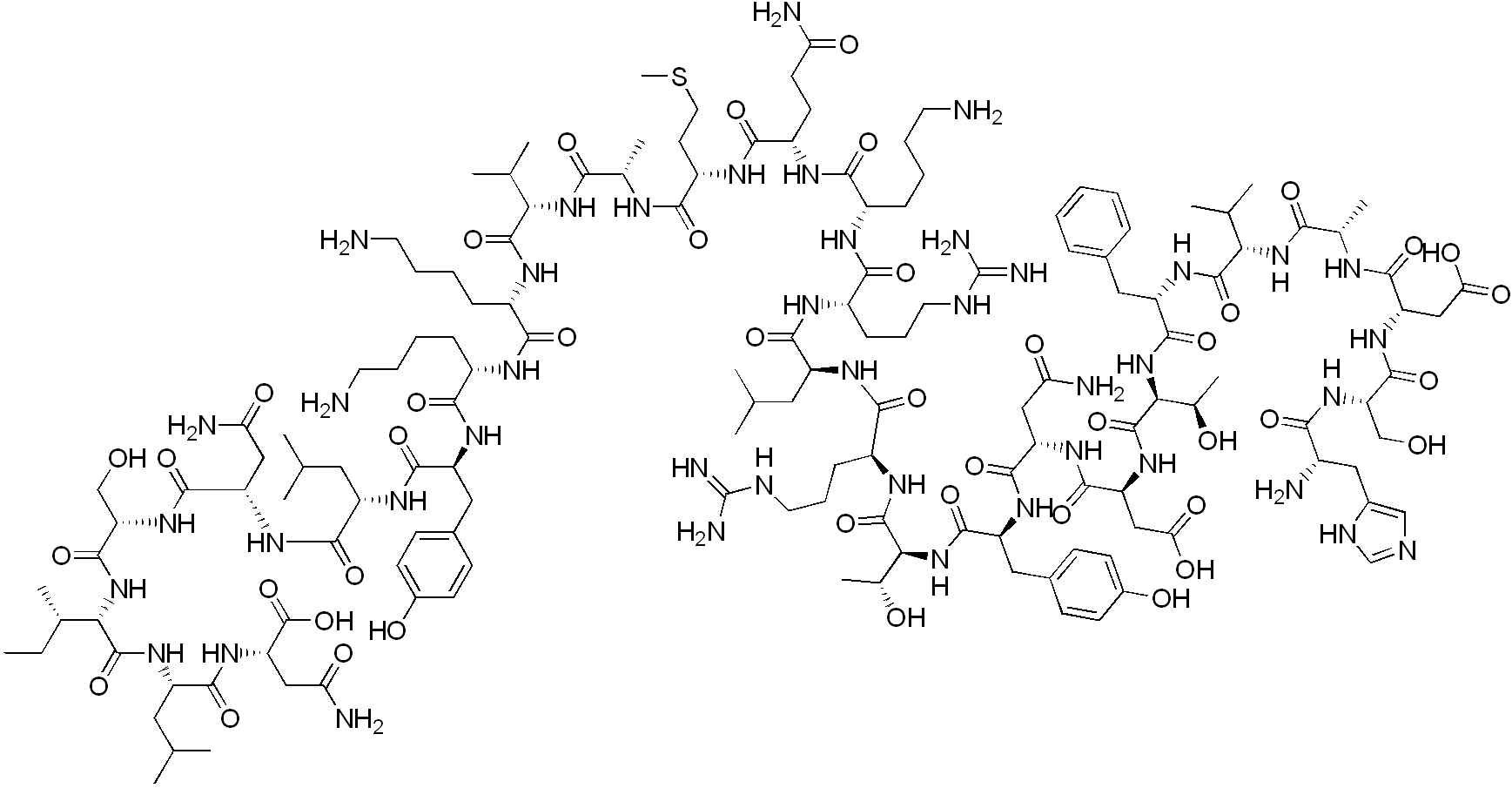

Clinical data
- Trade names: RLF-100 / Zyesamiô
- AHFS/Drugs.com: International Drug Names
- ATC code: R

Identifiers
- IUPAC name: (2S)-4-amino-2-[[(2S)-2-[[(2S,3S)-2-[[(2S)-2-[[(2S)-4-amino-2-[[(2S)-2-[[(2S)-2-[[(2S)-6-amino-2-[[(2S)-6-amino-2-[[(2S)-2-[[(2S)-2-[[(2S)-2-[[(2S)-5-amino-2-[[(2S)-6-amino-2-[[(2S)-2-[[(2S)-2-[[(2S)-2-[[(2S,3R)-2-[[(2S)-2-[[(2S)-4-amino-2-[[(2S)-2-[[(2S,3R)-2-[[(2S)-2-[[(2S)-2-[[(2S)-2-[[(2S)-2-[[(2S)-2-[[(2S)-2-amino-3-(1H-imidazol-5-yl)propanoyl]amino]-3-hydroxypropanoyl]amino]-3-carboxypropanoyl]amino]propanoyl]amino]-3-methylbutanoyl]amino]-3-phenylpropanoyl]amino]-3-hydroxybutanoyl]amino]-3-carboxypropanoyl]amino]-4-oxobutanoyl]amino]-3-(4-hydroxyphenyl)propanoyl]amino]-3-hydroxybutanoyl]amino]-5-carbamimidamidopentanoyl]amino]-4-methylpentanoyl]amino]-5-carbamimidamidopentanoyl]amino]hexanoyl]amino]-5-oxopentanoyl]amino]-4-methylsulfanylbutanoyl]amino]propanoyl]amino]-3-methylbutanoyl]amino]hexanoyl]amino]hexanoyl]amino]-3-(4-hydroxyphenyl)propanoyl]amino]-4-methylpentanoyl]amino]-4-oxobutanoyl]amino]-3-hydroxypropanoyl]amino]-3-methylpentanoyl]amino]-4-methylpentanoyl]amino]-4-oxobutanoic acid
- CAS Number: 40077-57-4
- PubChem CID: 16132300
- ChemSpider: 17288959
- UNII: A67JUW790C
- KEGG: D12127
- ChEMBL: ChEMBL2106041
- CompTox Dashboard (EPA): DTXSID7048584

Chemical and physical data
- Formula: C_{147}H_{237}N_{43}O_{43}S
- Molar mass: 3326.83 g·mol^{−1}
- 3D model (JSmol): Interactive image
- SMILES: CCC(C)C(C(=O)NC(CC(C)C)C(=O)NC(CC(=O)N)C(=O)O)NC(=O)C(CO)NC(=O)C(CC(=O)N)NC(=O)C(CC(C)C)NC(=O)C(Cc1ccc(cc1)O)NC(=O)C(CCCCN)NC(=O)C(CCCCN)NC(=O)C(C(C)C)NC(=O)C(C)NC(=O)C(CCSC)NC(=O)C(CCC(=O)N)NC(=O)C(CCCCN)NC(=O)C(CCCNC(=N)N)NC(=O)C(CC(C)C)NC(=O)C(CCCNC(=N)N)NC(=O)C(C(C)O)NC(=O)C(Cc2ccc(cc2)O)NC(=O)C(CC(=O)N)NC(=O)C(CC(=O)O)NC(=O)C(C(C)O)NC(=O)C(Cc3ccccc3)NC(=O)C(C(C)C)NC(=O)C(C)NC(=O)C(CC(=O)O)NC(=O)C(CO)NC(=O)C(Cc4cnc[nH]4)N
- InChI: InChI=1S/C147H237N43O43S/c1-18-75(12)115(142(229)180-96(56-72(6)7)131(218)183-104(145(232)233)63-110(155)200)188-139(226)106(68-192)185-134(221)101(62-109(154)199)177-130(217)95(55-71(4)5)174-132(219)97(58-81-37-41-84(195)42-38-81)175-125(212)88(33-23-26-49-149)167-123(210)89(34-24-27-50-150)171-140(227)113(73(8)9)186-118(205)76(13)164-121(208)93(47-53-234-17)170-127(214)92(45-46-107(152)197)169-122(209)87(32-22-25-48-148)166-124(211)90(35-28-51-161-146(156)157)168-129(216)94(54-70(2)3)173-126(213)91(36-29-52-162-147(158)159)172-143(230)116(78(15)193)189-136(223)98(59-82-39-43-85(196)44-40-82)176-133(220)100(61-108(153)198)178-135(222)103(65-112(203)204)182-144(231)117(79(16)194)190-137(224)99(57-80-30-20-19-21-31-80)181-141(228)114(74(10)11)187-119(206)77(14)165-128(215)102(64-111(201)202)179-138(225)105(67-191)184-120(207)86(151)60-83-66-160-69-163-83/h19-21,30-31,37-44,66,69-79,86-106,113-117,191-196H,18,22-29,32-36,45-65,67-68,148-151H2,1-17H3,(H2,152,197)(H2,153,198)(H2,154,199)(H2,155,200)(H,160,163)(H,164,208)(H,165,215)(H,166,211)(H,167,210)(H,168,216)(H,169,209)(H,170,214)(H,171,227)(H,172,230)(H,173,213)(H,174,219)(H,175,212)(H,176,220)(H,177,217)(H,178,222)(H,179,225)(H,180,229)(H,181,228)(H,182,231)(H,183,218)(H,184,207)(H,185,221)(H,186,205)(H,187,206)(H,188,226)(H,189,223)(H,190,224)(H,201,202)(H,203,204)(H,232,233)(H4,156,157,161)(H4,158,159,162)/t75-,76-,77-,78+,79+,86-,87-,88-,89-,90-,91-,92-,93-,94-,95-,96-,97-,98-,99-,100-,101-,102-,103-,104-,105-,106-,113-,114-,115-,116-,117-/m0/s1; Key:VBUWHHLIZKOSMS-RIWXPGAOSA-N

Aviptadil is an injectable synthetic formulation of human vasoactive intestinal peptide (VIP). VIP was discovered in 1970, and has been used to treat various inflammatory conditions, such as acute respiratory distress syndrome (ARDS), asthma, and chronic obstructive pulmonary disease (COPD).

== Regulatory history ==
=== ARDS in COVID-19 ===
Studies have found that aviptadil may be beneficial for severely ill patients with COVID-19 related ARDS. ACTIV-3, a trial examining aviptadil acetate (Zyesami), is recruiting patients as of July 2, 2021. A separate trial is examining inhaled aviptadil for patients with high risk for ARDS, is ongoing as of May 21, 2021. A trial for intravenous aviptadil for the same indication concluded in February 2021.

US-Israeli NeuroRx Inc partnered with Relief Therapeutics to develop aviptadil in the United States. In June 2020, the U.S. Food and Drug Administration granted fast-track designation to aviptadil for the treatment of respiratory distress in COVID-19. In September 2020, NeuroRX submitted a request for an Emergency Use Authorization to the US FDA for its use in patients in intensive care.

Jan 2021: Zuventus healthcare Ltd seeks approval for aviptadil from India's drug controller for emergency use in COVID-19 treatment. Mumbai's Zuventus Healthcare Ltd. has got the nod to conduct Phase 3 clinical trials of aviptadil injectable formulation. The SEC noted that Zuventus had presented revised Phase 3 clinical trial protocol before the committee, and after "detailed deliberation", it recommended grant of permission of Phase 3 trials with the drug.

May 2021: NRx Pharmaceuticals Announces Positive Results for ZYESAMI™ (aviptadil-acetate) and Submits Emergency Use Authorization Application to USFDA to Treat Critical COVID-19 in Patients Suffering from Respiratory Failure.

April 2022: The Central Licensing Authority, DCGI granted avipatdil manufacturing and marketing permission to Zuventus Healthcare Ltd under the brand name 'Oxyptadil', for treatment in patients with severe COVID-19 with ARDS.

=== Aviptadil/phentolamine combination for Erectile Dysfunction (ED) ===
October 2000 UK (Invicorp): aviptadil, in combination with the adrenergic drug phentolamine, is approved as an effective alternative therapy for erectile dysfunction (ED) patients. One dose intracavernosal injection contains 25 micrograms aviptadil and 2 mg of phentolamine mesilate for the treatment of ED. Aviptadil dose used for treatment of erectile dysfunction is a lot smaller than that for the treatment of ARDS.

== Vasoactive intestinal peptide (VIP) ==
Vasoactive intestinal peptide (VIP) is a 28-residue amino acid peptide first characterized in 1970 that was initially isolated from porcine duodenum. A member of the secretin/glucagon hormone superfamily, VIP was initially discovered owing to its potent vasodilatory effects (as its name implies). VIP is widely distributed in the central and peripheral nervous system as well as in the digestive, respiratory, reproductive, and cardiovascular systems as a neurotransmitter and neuroendocrine releasing factor. These effects contribute to an extensive range of physiological and pathological processes related to development, growth, and the control of neuronal, epithelial, and endocrine cell function.

=== VIP receptors ===
VIP acts on two receptors - VPAC1 and VPAC2, which are class B of G-protein-coupled receptors (GPCRs).VPAC1 is mainly present in the lung and T-lymphocytes, whereas VPAC2 is mainly seen in the smooth muscle, mast cells and the basal parts of the lung mucosa.

=== Expression of VIP ===
VIP is produced in the neurons in the central and peripheral nervous systems. VIP is mainly localized in the myenteric and submucosal neurons and nerve terminals in the GI tract. Endogenous VIP is released by numerous stimuli such as acetylcholine (ACh), ATP, serotonin (5-HT), substance P (SP), GLP-2 from at least two populations of VIP-positive nerves: cholinergic and non-cholinergic VIP-releasing nerves. In guinea pig small intestine, most VIP-positive nerves in the mucosa and submucosa are non-cholinergic secretomotor neurons and well colocalized with neuronal nitric oxide synthase (nNOS) in human colonic circular muscles. VIP is also expressed in immune cells, such as activated T cells and therefore present in lymphoid tissues including Peyer's patches, the spleen, and lymph nodes, in addition to the VIP-ergic innervation in lymphoid tissues. Beside the neuronal source, VIP is also expressed and released from endocrine organs - Heart, Thyroid, Kidney and GI tracts.

=== Localization of VIP ===
- VIP is highly localised in lungs (70%) and binds with alveolar type II (AT II) cells via VPAC1. The biological (vasodilator) activity of vasoactive intestinal peptide (VIP) was discovered in the lungs before the peptide was isolated and chemical identity characterized from intestine. VIP levels are also considerably high in the brain and the gut. It is localized in key sites in the lung, has potent activities on its major functions, and appears to play an important role in pulmonary physiology and disease.
- The principal localization of VIP-containing neurons in the tracheobronchial tree is in the smooth muscle layer, around submucosal mucous glands and in the walls of pulmonary and bronchial arteries. Immunoreactive VIP is also present in neuronal cell bodies forming microglia that provide a source of intrinsic innervation of pulmonary structures.

== Vasoactive Intestinal Peptide (VIP) and SARS-CoV-2 ==
VIP is highly localised in lungs and binds with alveolar type II (AT II) cells via VPAC1 receptor. AT II cells constitute only 5% of pulmonary epithelium. Angiotensin Converting Enzyme 2 (ACE 2) surface receptors are present in AT II cells. AT II cells produces surfactant and plays an important role in the maintenance of type 1 epithelial cells. SARS-CoV-2 enters into AT II cells by binding to ACE 2 surface receptors with its spike protein.
