= Sacubitrilat =

Chemical compound

Clinical data
- Other names: LBQ657
- ATC code: none

Identifiers
- IUPAC name: (2R,4S)-5-(4-Biphenylyl)-4-[(3-carboxypropanoyl)amino]-2-methylpentanoic acid
- CAS Number: 149709-44-4
- PubChem CID: 10430040
- ChemSpider: 8605468
- UNII: SPI5PBF81S
- ChEMBL: ChEMBL417007
- PDB ligand: 6LD (PDBe, RCSB PDB)

Chemical and physical data
- Formula: C_{22}H_{25}NO_{5}
- Molar mass: 383.444 g·mol^{−1}
- 3D model (JSmol): Interactive image
- SMILES: C[C@H](C[C@@H](CC1=CC=C(C=C1)C2=CC=CC=C2)NC(=O)CCC(=O)O)C(=O)O
- InChI: InChI=1S/C22H25NO5/c1-15(22(27)28)13-19(23-20(24)11-12-21(25)26)14-16-7-9-18(10-8-16)17-5-3-2-4-6-17/h2-10,15,19H,11-14H2,1H3,(H,23,24)(H,25,26)(H,27,28)/t15-,19+/m1/s1; Key:DOBNVUFHFMVMDB-BEFAXECRSA-N

Sacubitrilat (INN; or LBQ657) is the active metabolite of the antihypertensive drug sacubitril, which is used in the treatment of heart failure.
