= Gemopatrilat =

Chemical compound

Clinical data
- Other names: BMS-189921
- ATC code: None

Identifiers
- IUPAC name: (6S)-Hexahydro-6-[(αS)-α-mercaptohydrocinnamido]-2,2-dimethyl-7-oxo-1H-azepine-1-acetic acid
- CAS Number: 160135-92-2
- PubChem CID: 9886079
- ChemSpider: 8061752
- UNII: MU9089C77W
- KEGG: D04312
- ChEMBL: ChEMBL107747
- CompTox Dashboard (EPA): DTXSID901029484

Chemical and physical data
- Formula: C_{19}H_{26}N_{2}O_{4}S
- Molar mass: 378.49 g·mol^{−1}
- 3D model (JSmol): Interactive image
- SMILES: CC1(CCC[C@@H](C(=O)N1CC(=O)O)NC(=O)[C@H](CC2=CC=CC=C2)S)C
- InChI: InChI=1S/C19H26N2O4S/c1-19(2)10-6-9-14(18(25)21(19)12-16(22)23)20-17(24)15(26)11-13-7-4-3-5-8-13/h3-5,7-8,14-15,26H,6,9-12H2,1-2H3,(H,20,24)(H,22,23)/t14-,15-/m0/s1; Key:YRSVDSQRGBYVIY-GJZGRUSLSA-N

Gemopatrilat (INN) is an experimental drug that was never marketed. It acts as a vasopeptidase inhibitor. It inhibits both angiotensin-converting enzyme (ACE) and neutral endopeptidase (neprilysin).
