= Female sexual arousal disorder =

- Other names: Candace syndrome, female sexual interest/arousal disorder
- Specialty: Psychiatry, gynaecology

Female sexual arousal disorder (FSAD) is a disorder characterized by a persistent or recurrent inability to attain sexual arousal or to maintain arousal until the completion of a sexual activity. The diagnosis can also refer to an inadequate lubrication-swelling response normally present during arousal and sexual activity. The condition should be distinguished from a general loss of interest in sexual activity and from other sexual dysfunctions, such as the orgasmic disorder (anorgasmia) and hypoactive sexual desire disorder, which is characterized as a lack or absence of sexual fantasies and desire for sexual activity for some period of time.

Although female sexual dysfunction is currently a contested diagnostic, it has become more common in recent years to use testosterone-based drugs off-label to treat FSAD. It is a subtype of female sexual dysfunction. It results in distress due to the inability to attain or maintain adequate vaginal lubrication.

== Types ==
There are three proposed subtypes of FSAD which have been identified: genital arousal disorder, subjective arousal disorder, and combined arousal disorder.This encompasses five domains: arousal, satisfaction, desire, pain, and lubrication.

With genital arousal disorder, there is still a mental feeling of arousal, but it is not matched by any physical response. For example, a woman may be "turned on" by her partner, but her vagina does not produce lubrication and there is little-to-no increase in blood flow to the genitals. Subjective arousal disorder is the reverse issue, where there is a physical response to sexual circumstances, but an inability to feel mentally aroused. Combined arousal disorder combines both genital arousal disorder and subjective arousal disorder, presenting as a lack of sexual feeling altogether, both mentally and physically.

== Causes ==
A number of studies have explored the factors that contribute to female sexual arousal disorder and female orgasmic disorder. These factors include both psychological and physical factors.

=== Individual factors ===
There has been little investigation of the impact of individual factors on female sexual dysfunction. Such factors include stress, levels of fatigue, gender identity, health, and other individual attributes and experiences, such as dysfunctional sexual beliefs that may affect sexual desire or response. An individual's sexual activity is disrupted by overwhelming emotional distress resulting in inability to attain sexual pleasure. Sexual dysfunction can also occur secondary to major psychiatric disorders, including depression.

=== Relationship factors ===
A substantial body of research has explored the role of interpersonal factors in female sexual dysfunction, particularly in relation to orgasmic response. These studies have largely focused on the impact of the quality of the relationship on the sexual functioning of the partners. Some studies have evaluated the role of specific relationship variables, whereas others have examined overall relationship satisfaction. Some studies have explored events, while others have focused on attitudes as an empirical measure of relationship functioning. Subject populations have varied from distressed couples to sexually dysfunctional clients to those in satisfied relationships.

=== Physical factors ===
Estimates of the percentage of female sexual dysfunction attributable to physical factors have ranged from 30% to 80%. The disorders most likely to result in sexual dysfunction are those that lead to problems in circulatory or neurological function. These factors have been more extensively explored in men than in women. Physical etiologies such as neurological and cardiovascular illnesses have been directly implicated in both premature and retarded ejaculation as well as in erectile disorder, but the contribution of physiological factors to female sexual dysfunction is not so clear. However, recent literature does suggest that there may be an impairment in the arousal phase among diabetic women. Given that diabetic women show a significant variability in their response to this medical disorder, it is not surprising that the disease's influence on arousal is also highly variable. In fact, the lack of a clear association between medical disorders and sexual functioning suggests that psychological factors play a significant part in the impact of these disorders on sexual functioning.

Several types of medications, including selective serotonin reuptake inhibitors (SSRIs), can cause sexual dysfunction and in the case of SSRI and SNRI, these dysfunctions may become permanent after the end of the treatment.

One third of post operation transgender women experience FSAD roughly consistent with postmenopausal women. HSDD in transgender women is largely caused by a lack of testosterone especially after the gonads are removed during bottom surgery, as androgens are produced in smaller concentrations lower than ovulating women. Progesterone has shown to alleviate some symptoms of HSDD in transgender women, as well as other hormone treatments.

=== Interplay of causes ===
Kaplan proposed that sexual dysfunction was based on intrapsychic, interpersonal, and behavioural levels. Four factors were identified that could have a role in the development of sexual dysfunction: 1) lack of correct information regarding sexual and social interaction, 2) unconscious guilt or anxiety regarding sex, 3) performance anxiety, and 4) failure to communicate between the partners.

== Diagnosis ==
=== DSM-5 ===
The DSM-5 lists the diagnostic criteria as including a minimum of three of the following:

1. Little interest in sex
2. Few thoughts related to sex
3. Decreased start and rejecting of sex
4. Little pleasure during sex most of the time
5. Decreased interest in sex even when exposed to erotic stimuli
6. Little genital sensations during sex most of the time

=== DSM-IV ===
The DSM-IV (American Psychiatric Association 1994) diagnostic criteria were:

1. persistent or recurrent inability to attain, or to maintain until completion of the sexual activity, an adequate lubrication-swelling response of sexual excitement,
2. the disturbance causes marked distress or interpersonal difficulty, and
3. the sexual dysfunction is not better accounted for by another Axis I disorder (except another sexual dysfunction) and is not due exclusively to the direct physiological effects of a substance (e.g., a drug of abuse, a medication) or a general medical condition.

Marita P. McCabe noted:

Difficulties arise with this definition in terms of what constitutes an adequate lubrication-swelling response. There is no "gold standard" regarding the length of time it should take to become aroused or the level of arousal that should be achieved. These responses may vary from one woman to another and are dependent on a range of factors, which include her general mood when sexual stimulation commences and her partner's skill in stimulating her. There may also be differences in physiological and subjective levels of arousal, with some women reporting no feelings of sexual arousal despite evidence of vaginal vasocongestion and others reporting arousal in the absence of such evidence. The expectations and past experiences of clinicians and clients may also lead them to classify the same symptoms as female sexual arousal disorder in one woman but not in another.

=== Subtypes ===
There are several proposed subtypes of female sexual arousal disorders. They may indicate onset: lifelong (since birth) or acquired. There may be a contextual component. They may occur in all situations (generalized) or be situation-specific (situational). For example, the disorder may occur with a spouse but not with a different partner.

The length of time the disorder has existed and the extent to which it is partner- or situation-specific, as opposed to occurring in all situations, may be the result of different causative factors and may influence the treatment for the disorder. It may be due to psychological factors or a combination of factors.

== Treatment ==
The FDA has approved flibanserin and bremelanotide for low sexual libido in women.

== Criticism ==
One problem with the definition in the DSM-IV is that subjective arousal is not included. There is often no correlation between women's subjective and physiological arousal. With this in mind, recently, FSAD has been divided up into sub-types:

- Genital Arousal Disorder
- Subjective Sexual Arousal Disorder
- Combined Genital and Subjective Arousal Disorder

The third sub-type is the most common in clinical settings.

One criticism is that "the meaningful benefits of experimental drugs for women's sexual difficulties are questionable, and the financial conflicts of interest of experts who endorse the notion of a highly prevalent medical condition are extensive."

Professor of bioethics and sociology Jennifer R. Fishman argues that the categorization of female sexual dysfunction as a treatable disease has only been made possible through the input of academic clinical researchers. Through ethnographic research, she believes she has shown how academic clinical researchers have provided the scientific research needed by pharmaceutical companies to bio-medicalize female sexual dysfunction and consequently identify a market of consumers for it. She questions the professional ethics of this exchange network between researchers and pharmaceutical companies, as the clinical research trials are funded by pharmaceutical companies and researchers are given considerable financial rewards for their work. She argues that the conferences where definition of the disease and diagnostic criteria are defined and research is presented to clinicians are also ethically ambiguous, as they are also funded by pharmaceutical companies.

Heather Hartely of Portland State University, Oregon is critical of the shift from female sexual dysfunction being framed as an arousal problem to a desire problem. In her article, "The 'Pinking' of Viagra Culture", she states that the change from hypoactive sexual desire disorder to female sexual arousal disorder is indicative of "disease mongering" tactics by the drug industry through an effort to match up a drug to some subcomponent of the DSM classification.

Additionally, Leonore Tiefer of NYU School of Medicine voiced concerns that the success of Viagra, in combination with feminist rhetoric, were being used as a means of fast-tracking public acceptance of pharmaceutical treatment of female sexual arousal disorder. The justification behind this, she says, is that "the branding of Viagra has succeeded so thoroughly in rationalizing the idea of sexual correction and enhancement through pills that it seems inevitable and only fair that such a product be made available for women," giving a dangerous appeal to "nonapproved drugs though off-label prescribing".
