= Fetal origins hypothesis =

Hypothesis that prenatal conditions shape long-term health and related outcomes

The fetal origins hypothesis (FOH), also known as the Barker hypothesis or (in biomedical literature) the fetal origins of adult disease (FOAD), proposes that conditions during gestation—especially nutrition, endocrine signals, stress, and toxic exposures—can produce lasting changes in fetal development that later influence health and disease risk across the life course.

The hypothesis is now usually discussed as part of the broader developmental origins of health and disease (DOHaD) framework, which includes exposures from preconception through infancy and early childhood, and emphasizes the concept of developmental programming (lasting effects of early-life conditions on later physiology and metabolism).

Evidence relevant to FOH comes from multiple disciplines, including epidemiology, developmental biology, endocrinology, epigenetics, and economics. While many studies report associations between prenatal conditions (often proxied by birth weight or gestational exposures) and later outcomes, critics note that causal inference is challenging because of confounding by family, socioeconomic, and postnatal factors, and because birth size may be an imperfect measure of in utero conditions.

== Terminology and scope ==
In biomedical research, the fetal origins hypothesis is closely related to the terms developmental programming and fetal origins of adult disease (FOAD/FOH/FOAD are sometimes used interchangeably). In economics and demography, fetal origins often refers more narrowly to the long-run consequences of shocks occurring in utero (for example, pandemics, famines, or environmental disasters) on later outcomes such as educational attainment, earnings, and disability.

== Historical development ==
=== Recognition that prenatal exposures can have lasting effects ===
Although teratology (the study of birth defects) is distinct from FOH, major mid-20th-century events helped establish that the fetus is not insulated from maternal exposures and that prenatal insults can have effects that emerge long after birth. The thalidomide disaster (late 1950s–early 1960s) caused an epidemic of severe congenital malformations in children whose mothers used thalidomide during pregnancy. In 1971, a rare clear-cell adenocarcinoma of the vagina in young women was linked to prenatal exposure to diethylstilbestrol (DES). In 1973, fetal alcohol syndrome was described as a recognizable pattern of malformation and growth restriction among children born to mothers with heavy alcohol use during pregnancy.

=== Barker's hypothesis and early epidemiological work ===
Epidemiologist David J. P. Barker helped popularize the fetal origins hypothesis through studies linking early-life conditions to adult chronic disease. In a 1986 paper, Barker and colleagues reported that areas of England and Wales with higher infant mortality (a marker associated with adverse early-life conditions) later had higher rates of ischaemic heart disease. Subsequent work broadened the hypothesis by relating markers of fetal growth (including low birth weight) to later cardiovascular and metabolic risk in multiple cohorts and settings.

== Proposed mechanisms ==
FOH/DOHaD research proposes that the fetus shows developmental plasticity: in response to cues about nutrient supply, stress hormones, inflammation, or toxins, developing organs and regulatory systems adapt in ways that may be advantageous in the short term but can increase later disease susceptibility if the postnatal environment differs from what those cues “predict”.

Mechanisms discussed in reviews include:

- Structural and functional changes in organs (for example, altered growth of the pancreas, kidneys, vasculature, or brain) during sensitive developmental windows.
- Endocrine and metabolic programming involving maternal–placental–fetal signaling (including glucocorticoids, insulin, and other hormones).
- Epigenetic regulation (e.g., DNA methylation and chromatin changes) that can persist and influence gene expression without altering DNA sequence.

== Evidence in humans ==
=== Cardiometabolic outcomes and proxies for fetal growth ===
Many studies have used birth weight, gestational age, and related measures as proxies for fetal growth and intrauterine conditions, reporting associations with later coronary artery disease, hypertension, type 2 diabetes, and related outcomes. However, reviews have emphasized that birth weight is an imperfect proxy and may not lie on the causal pathway; associations may reflect confounding by shared familial, socioeconomic, or genetic factors as well as postnatal exposures.

More recent research has attempted to address confounding using designs such as sibling comparisons. For example, a large Swedish cohort study that accounted for familial factors reported that associations between low birth weight and early-adult cardiovascular disease risk were attenuated and not statistically significant relative to normal birth weight.

=== Famines and other “natural experiments” ===
Historical crises that change nutrition or infection exposures for a well-defined gestational cohort are frequently used as quasi-experiments in both epidemiology and economics.

==== Dutch Hunger Winter ====
Research on the Dutch famine of 1944–45 (the “Hunger Winter”) has reported long-term associations between prenatal famine exposure and later health outcomes, with timing in gestation often considered important. A widely cited epigenetic study comparing adults conceived during the famine with their same-sex siblings reported differences in DNA methylation at the imprinted IGF2 locus decades later, consistent with persistent molecular changes following brief prenatal adversity.

==== Chinese famine (1959–61) ====
Many studies have examined long-term outcomes among people born around the Great Chinese Famine (1959–61). A systematic review and meta-analysis concluded that reported associations with cardiometabolic outcomes were highly sensitive to study design, and that uncontrolled age differences between famine and post-famine birth cohorts could explain many effects commonly attributed to the famine; more robust evidence was suggested for some neuropsychiatric outcomes such as schizophrenia.

==== Pandemics and maternal infection ====
Prenatal exposure to large-scale disease outbreaks has been used to test fetal-origins predictions in multiple settings. In economics, analyses of cohorts in gestation during the 1918 flu pandemic have reported long-run differences in education, earnings, and disability relative to nearby birth cohorts, consistent with fetal-origins effects on human capital.

Evidence linking maternal influenza during pregnancy to later neuropsychiatric outcomes has been mixed. A 2022 systematic review reported inconsistent findings for associations between prenatal exposure to maternal influenza infection and later schizophrenia-spectrum outcomes.

=== Other gestational exposures ===
FOH research also considers a wide range of prenatal exposures beyond famine or infection, including psychosocial stress, maternal obesity and metabolic disease, and environmental pollution.

==== Air pollution ====
Ambient air pollutants can affect maternal health and may influence fetal development through placental and inflammatory pathways. A frequently cited epidemiological study reported associations between maternal residence in areas with higher ambient air pollution and increased risk of certain birth defects in Southern California.

==== Ramadan fasting ====
Ramadan fasting has been studied as a time-limited, culturally patterned change in diet and daily rhythms. In economics, one influential study used timing of gestation relative to Ramadan to estimate associations between presumed in utero exposure and later outcomes such as disability measures and economic indicators in some settings.

Clinical and public health reviews of Ramadan fasting during pregnancy have generally concluded that evidence for adverse effects on common birth outcomes (such as birthweight and preterm delivery) is mixed and often limited by study quality, with less evidence available on rare outcomes or long-term child development.

== Economics and social-science research ==
In economics, fetal-origins research often focuses on how prenatal shocks affect later human capital and socioeconomic outcomes. Reviews have summarized evidence from historical “natural experiments” including pandemics, famines, policy changes affecting maternal nutrition, and environmental disasters. This literature commonly uses administrative data and cohort comparisons to estimate effects on outcomes such as education, earnings, disability, and participation in social programs.

== Criticism and methodological issues ==
Critiques of the fetal origins hypothesis emphasize challenges in establishing causality:

- Confounding and selection: prenatal and postnatal environments are correlated, and socioeconomic conditions can affect both fetal growth and later-life exposures.
- Measurement: birth weight and related metrics may not capture the relevant intrauterine exposures or mechanisms.
- Design sensitivity: results can change with the choice of control groups and analytic approaches; systematic reviews of famine studies have highlighted this issue.
- Mixed evidence across outcomes: for some hypothesized consequences (for example, specific neuropsychiatric outcomes following maternal influenza), systematic reviews have found inconsistent findings.

Because of these issues, some authors have argued that policy or clinical recommendations should focus on improving maternal and child health broadly rather than targeting fetal growth measures alone, until mechanisms and causal pathways are better established.

== Implications for public health ==
Within the DOHaD framework, fetal-origins research has encouraged attention to health determinants before and during pregnancy, including nutrition, chronic disease management, infectious disease prevention, and reduction of harmful exposures such as alcohol, tobacco smoke, and certain drugs.

== See also ==
- Developmental origins of health and disease
- Fetal programming
- Birth weight
- Thrifty phenotype
- Epigenetics
- Life-course approach to health
- Prenatal nutrition
