= Developmental origins of health and disease =

Medical approach emphasizing early-life environmental causes of disease

Developmental origins of health and disease (DOHaD) is an approach to medical research factors that can lead to the development of human diseases during early life development. These factors include the role of prenatal and perinatal exposure to environmental factors, such as undernutrition, stress, environmental chemical, etc. This approach includes an emphasis on epigenetic causes of adult chronic non-communicable diseases. As well as physical human disease, the psychopathology of the foetus can also be predicted by epigenetic factors.

== Origin ==
DOHaD has evolved into its modern understanding from several precursor concepts. In the 19th century the idea of "maternal impressions" was popular. Maternal impression is the idea that anything the mother did before giving birth could affect her offspring. Our modern understanding of DOHaD was developed by several studies by David Barker and his colleagues, which showed a strong relationship between infant mortality rates from 1921 to 1925 and ischemic heart disease rates from 1968 to 1978. This led to the fetal origins hypothesis of the origins of adult diseases, which proposed that this relationship was caused by differences in early life nutrition, with a supporting theory that birthweight is connected to the development of chronic disease.

During the Dutch Hunger Winter Famine (1944-1945) mothers were not able to receive the proper nutrition needed to healthily carry a baby. The babies who were born during this time developed diseases (such as heart disease, schizophrenia, and type 2 diabetes) at increased levels. Researchers were able to determine, decades after the famine, that the babies born during Dutch famine had an increase in methylation in some genes and a decrease in methylation in other genes compared to their siblings who were not born during the famine. The methylation levels explain why these individuals were predisposed to certain diseases. Data collected from the Dutch famine and similar events, such as the one at Leningrad, provided a reliable source of information to scientists studying DOHaD.

These studies in turn led to greater interest in the roles of developmental plasticity and early life environmental exposures in adult disease. The World Congress on Fetal Origins of Adult Disease held two meetings – one in 2001 and the other in 2003 – summarizing the new research in these areas. This congress later evolved into the International Society for Developmental Origins of Health and Disease.

== Dutch hunger winter study ==
Between 1944 and 1945, in the western regions of the Netherlands and in Amsterdam, a famine broke out due to a railway strike and German control limiting supplies. The people of these countries were receiving extremely limited calories (around 400-800 a day) which had an extreme effect on pregnant women and their children. Researchers began studying a cohort of middle-aged individuals whose mothers had been pregnant with them during the famine. The Dutch Hunger Winter study provided significant data to support the DOHaD. Further studies indicated that older people had a resilience to the effects of malnutrition on physical health in late life, but a higher vulnerability to socioeconomic stunting. Results concluded that the women with low caloric and nutritional intake during pregnancy had children that had greater rates of obesity as opposed to those who were not exposed to famine. This is conclusive with the DOHaD theory. The study goes on to investigate at what points in development DOHaD stood true. It is thought that exposure to famine in early gestational periods has a greater effect on the foetus, however, these theories are still under investigation.

== Developmental plasticity ==
=== Thrifty phenotype hypothesis ===
The thrifty phenotype hypothesis was proposed by C. Nicholas Hales and David Barker in a study published in 1992. This hypothesis suggested that poor growth during the fetal and infant stages can cause a development of type 2 diabetes later in life. Hales and Barker suggested that this poor growth was due to maternal malnutrition which leads to low birth weight. As previously stated, low infant birth weight usually leads to an increased risk of obesity which, if not acted on, can lead to type 2 diabetes.

The paper suggests that due to maternal malnutrition, infants can have lower birth weights. Since this is occurring during the plastic stage of development, this can cause the foetus to be "programmed" to conserve energy and store fat, thus leading to a lower metabolism. If there is a surplus of food during adulthood their body simply stores this abundance as more fat. This can then lead to not only diabetes but other metabolic diseases, too.

=== Responses of plasticity ===
There are two different types of plasticity responses when dealing with human development. The first is an immediate adaptive response. This response will alter the development that is needed to survive if there have been changes in the environment. An example of this type of response is when oxygen deprivation causes a change in blood flow that would normally help with the expense of less critical tissues. Predictive adaptive response (PAR) is the second type of plasticity response. PARs are cues that happen in early life development that cause phenotype development to change that are normally adapted to environmental cues in later life. This can be a benefit only when the predicted and actual postnatal environment match.

=== Environmental mismatch hypothesis ===
This is also referred to as the mismatch theory. Foetal malnutrition followed by excess nutrition in adults is a key example of environmental mismatches. This is very common among people born in impoverished societies. For pregnant women who are living in this type of circumstance the foetuses which are in utero are more likely to sense a low-protein condition and alter their development to survive. Therefore, the foetus will predict that getting food will be very difficult which then will set its metabolism for a "thrifty phenotype". By doing this it will use every calorie to its most efficient use for survival. This can be the same cause for a society with plenty of food available. The embryo will develop insulin resistance and enzyme levels will convert the food that is not being used into fat, which in later life can lead to obesity and diabetes. Overall the environmental mismatch hypothesis is an advantage for human development but not without some disadvantage in later life.

== Mechanisms ==
Epigenetic alterations of gene expression are closely related with developmental origins of the health and disease hypothesis. DNA methylation, histone modifications and non-coding RNAs are altered by the environment in the womb and potentially go on to produce higher rates of adult disease later in life.

=== DNA methylation ===
The process of DNA methylation is the most studied epigenetic response as it relates to the developmental origins of health and disease. The methylation of chief regulatory cytosines changes the DNA's hydrophobicity and begins to inhibit interactions with transcription factors responsible for the expression of the gene. Certain metabolic disorders, cancer and neurodegenerative disorders can be attributed to DNA methylation events.

=== Histone modification ===
Modifications of histones are important processes in developmental programming, with studies showing that maternal and paternal stress can induce histone modifications. These histone modifications alter phenotypes of organisms and can be the mechanism behind the predisposition of some metabolic disorders. Unbalanced diets increase the thioredoxin-interacting protein expressions causing blastocysts to form incorrectly because of altered histone methylation. High-fat diets are shown to alter histone methylation and acetylation and potentially lead to changes in gene expression within fetal adipose, liver, and skeletal muscle tissues.

=== Non-coding RNAs ===
Recent studies have shown the importance in non-coding RNA's ability to regulate cell differentiation and organismal development. There are many types of non-coding RNA that are present and play a role in differentiating stem cells. There are many non-coding RNAs responsible for differentiating cells for human brain and muscle development. These RNA molecules have also been implicated in having a role in cardiovascular development. Long non-coding RNA called lncRNA Fendrr has shown to be an important regulator of heart development and it modifies chromatin and controls developmental signaling of genetically modified mice hearts. There is still a vast amount of research needed to fully understand this mechanism and its relation to DOHaD.

== Examples ==
=== Cardiovascular disease ===
In a study done by Barker, he found a strong connection between poor prenatal environments and increased possibilities of cardiovascular diseases in adults. He found a direct correlation between infant mortality in 1921-1925 and mortality rates in 1968-1978 because of heart diseases in England. In areas where pregnant mothers had to face poor nutritional states, their newborn children were at a high risk of death. If they survived the early stages of life, they developed a higher risk of cardiovascular diseases.

Studies on rats found that maternal nutrient restriction resulted in damage to the cardiac renin-angiotensin system (which regulates blood pressure and volume). Additionally, these studies have shown a decrease in the number of nephrons produced by the offspring of these mothers. These differences have been found to affect males and females differently, at least in the early stages. The exact mechanism of action is unknown but it is believed that it is epigenetic.

=== Metabolic diseases ===
A study done at UC Irvine looked at the impact that maternal stress has on foetal development and overall foetal health. The researchers determined that a mother's stress and adverse pregnancy outcomes (APOs) related to the length of gestation and growth of the foetus along with impacts on the endocrine and immune systems of the foetus.

Early life influences, both prenatal and postnatal, have important effects on children later in life. It was determined that breastfed infants have significantly lower risks of obesity later in life than infants that were formula-fed.

Nutrition and growth during the early years of life can be related to the growth of diseases in humans later in their lives. For example, a study done in Jamaica showed that the blood pressure of children was associated with the mother's hemoglobin levels and body fat during pregnancy. Another example of this is shown in an article from the New England Journal of Medicine which took place during the Dutch famine. This study concluded that those who were in utero at the time of the famine were at a greater risk of obesity, hypertension, and heart disease than those who were born before or after the famine.

A maternal high-fat diet was used to help investigate how saturated fats cause unrestrained gestational weight gain and maternal obesity of offspring. When there is high-fat feeding during pregnancy, there are effects on the maternal metabolism and body composition. Some of the effects are insulin resistance, increased circulating lipids, increased adiposity, and hyperinsulinemia (high insulin in blood). When the fat intake was increased it started to adjust consumption of other macronutrients in the diet, which reduced the carbohydrate and protein consumption to match the increase of fatty acid. On another note, people who have obesity and a diet that is high in fat can develop a condition called dyslipidemia. It can lead to fibrosis of the liver, which is the cause for about 45% of deaths in the world.

During the Dutch famine doctors found that under-nutrition during the gestation period related to reduced glucose tolerance and raised insulin concentrations between the ages 50 and 58. There were 120 minute glucose and insulin concentrations that were known to be higher in people that were exposed to the famine at any stage during foetal development than those who were not exposed. The effect could be explained due to the lower birth rates of babies that were born during the famine and the low weight gain of their mothers. People that were born before the famine had a larger increase in glucose and insulin concentration. That was due to them experiencing starvation during the early stage of their life which might have impacted their postnatal growth pattern.

=== Autism spectrum disorder ===
Autism spectrum disorder (ASD) is a condition that typically manifests during the first three years of a person's life. It is a developmental disorder that impairs the brain's ability to develop the typical social and communication skills that are necessary for everyday life. People with ASD may experience difficulties with social interactions, verbal and nonverbal communication, and repetitive or restricted behaviors. The degree to which ASD affects an individual can vary widely, with some people experiencing mild symptoms while others may face more significant challenges.

The precise cause of ASD is still unknown, but it is believed that a combination of factors may contribute to its development. Research suggests that genetics may play a role, as ASD can run in families. In addition, certain medications taken during pregnancy may increase the risk of a child developing ASD. While some theories have been proposed, they have yet to be proven. For instance, some scientists believe that damage to a specific region of the brain, the amygdala, may be linked to ASD, while others are examining the possibility that a viral infection may trigger the disorder.

There has been some controversy regarding whether vaccines can cause ASD, but numerous studies have shown that there is no evidence of a link between vaccines and ASD. Major medical and government organizations have also confirmed this finding. The increase in ASD diagnoses in recent years may be attributed to better awareness and more comprehensive definitions of the disorder. Treatment for ASD involves a highly structured schedule of constructive activities that build on the child's interests and various techniques. It is important to avoid unproven treatments and seek advice from ASD specialists.

=== Schizophrenia ===
Large-scale famines offer insights into the effects prenatal malnutrition has on developing foetuses. A team led by Mingqing Xu investigated this possible connection between prenatal malnutrition and schizophrenia by analyzing medical records of people born between 1960 and 1961 during the Great Chinese Famine. This study found that there was a two-fold risk for someone who was born in a rural area during this period of famine to later develop schizophrenia than someone who was born either before or after. However, being born in an urban area during this time was not associated with an increased risk of schizophrenia. This is probably due to factors that exacerbated the impact of the famine in rural areas such as grain procurement and lack of large-scale grain storage.

Similar results have been found in studying the effects of the Dutch famine from 1944 to 1945. A study by Hoek compared the levels of schizophrenia for those born between August 15 and December 31, 1945, to those born after the famine had ended. This study found that those born during the time period were between two and two and a half times more likely to have schizophrenia than those born after the famine had ended.

The exact mechanism which connects undernutrition to an increased chance of schizophrenia later in life is not fully understood. Famines may lead to an enhanced risk of schizophrenia because they deprive the developing foetus of key micronutrients. Some of the leading candidates are folate, essential fatty acids, retinoids, vitamin D, and iron. Of these micronutrients, folate, iron and vitamin D seem to be the most promising. Folate jumps out as a key candidate as the occurrence of neural tube defects raised alongside schizophrenia during the Dutch famine. A lack of folate could cause DNA methylation which may affect the expression of genes crucial to neurodevelopment, and it could impede the conversion of homocysteine to methionine, causing homocysteine to accumulate and cause problems in the developing brain. Iron has been put forward as a leading candidate as low levels of hemoglobin, a molecule created by iron, during development was highly associated with developing schizophrenia later on in life. This connection may be due to iron having a key role in the creation and function of dopamine transmission.

Another, less accepted, theory that explains the connection between famine and schizophrenia is protein-calorie malnutrition. Protein-calorie malnutrition has been associated with increased dopamine and serotonin release and malfunctions in the hippocampus such as reduced dendritic branching and a lower cell count, which are also found in people with schizophrenia.

=== Maternal stress ===
The effect stress has on expecting women may not only affect them, but their child as well. Studies have shown a link between child mental health and behavioral problems to maternal stress during pregnancy. Stress in the body leads to an increase in the cortisol levels. Maternal stress, therefore, exposes the fetus to high cortisol levels. Additionally stress falls along the line of exposure to depression or anxiety within the mother. These factors have been found to be associated with emotional and cognitive issues within the child's later life. These levels have been linked to neurological and behavioral regulation issues in the child later in life. For example, cognitive performance at 5 years of age was impaired in kids who mother had experienced stress from a catastrophic ice storm. Investigators found that schizophrenia was frequent in offspring that mothers endured the ice storm during pregnancy. Prenatal stress has been shown to increase reactivity in infants. Infants that are from pregnancy with a lot of stress are harder to soothe rather than those that mothers didn't experience any stress during pregnancy. Human and animal studies did show that infants from stressed pregnancies have a poor immune function and are more likely to contract childhood illnesses as well as mental disorders.

There was a study published in the Journal of Pediatrics of August 19, 2020, which looked at how maternal recognition and stress can affect infant health after or during pregnancy. The study consisted of women from low income areas, and those that were overweight which were at the age of 28 years old. The women had to rate how they felt during challenges they had to endure. The infants born during this study had to get their medical records looked at from the first year of their lives. There was a 38 percent increase for having infectious illnesses. There was a 73 percent increase from not having non-infectious illnesses with an increase of 53 percent in other illnesses amid the infants. It seems that the effects were more likely later in the pregnancy, but after the study was completed they realized that stress and depression in mothers is not associated with increase in illnesses amongst the infants.
