= Dohad =

Dohad may refer to:

- Dahod, a town-city in India
- Developmental Origins of Health and Disease in the context of thrifty phenotype
