= DOHaD China =

Chinese-affiliated research organization

DOHaD China, refers to Chinese participation in the International Society for Developmental Origins of Health and Disease, an International non-profit membership organization of researchers, clinicians, and health professionals focused on the developmental origins of health and disease. It was set up in 2008 and made up of various scientists and clinicians (17 main council members).
