= Prenatal nutrition =

Nutrition of the mother during pregnancy

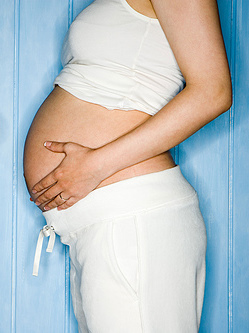
Pregnancy.

Prenatal nutrition addresses nutrient recommendations before and during pregnancy. Nutrition and weight management before and during pregnancy has a profound effect on the development of infants. This is a rather critical time for healthy development since infants rely heavily on maternal stores and nutrients for optimal growth and health outcome later in life.

Prenatal nutrition has a strong influence on birth weight and further development of the infant. A study at the National Institution of Health found that babies born from an obese mother have a higher probability to fail tests of fine motor skills which is the movement of small muscles such as the hands and fingers.

A common saying that a woman "is eating for two" while pregnant implies that a mother should consume twice as much during pregnancy, but is misleading. Although maternal consumption will directly affect both herself and the growing fetus, overeating excessively will compromise the baby's health as the infant will have to work extra hard to become healthy in the future. Compared with the infant, the mother possesses the least biological risk. Therefore, excessive calories, rather than going to the infant, often get stored as fat in the mother. On the other hand, insufficient consumption will result in lower birth weight.

Maintaining a healthy weight during gestation lowers adverse risks on infants such as birth defects, as well as chronic conditions in adulthood such as obesity, diabetes, and cardiovascular disease (CVD). Ideally, the rate of weight gain should be monitored during pregnancy to support the most ideal infant development.

== Background ==
=== Barker's Hypothesis: the impact of in utero conditions on fetal growth and development ===
The "Barker Hypothesis", or Thrifty phenotype, states that conditions during pregnancy will have long-term effects on adult health. Associated risk of lifelong diseases includes cardiovascular disease, type-2 diabetes, obesity, and hypertension. Babies born lighter in weight appear to have an increased rate of mortality than babies born at a heavier weight. This does not mean that heavy babies are less of a concern. Death rate would rise as birth weight increases beyond normal birth weight range. Therefore, it is important to maintain a healthy gestational weight gain throughout pregnancy for achieving the optimal infant birth weight.

When this theory was first proposed, it was not well accepted and was met with much skepticism. The main criticism was that confounding variables—nutrition in early life, the rate of weight gain throughout childhood, and other environmental factors—could attribute to many of the chronic diseases first noted in these low birth-weight populations. Because of this, there was a lack of support for birth weight being recognized as an independent risk factor. Subsequent research studies aimed to adjust for these environmental factors and in turn, provided more convincing results with minimal confounding variables.

"Barker's Hypothesis" is also known as "Fetal Programming Hypothesis". The word "programming" illustrates the idea that during critical periods in early fetal development, there are persisting changes in the body structure and function that are caused by environmental stimuli. This relates to the concept of developmental plasticity, which posits that genes are expressed in different ranges of physiological or morphological states as a response to the environmental conditions experienced during fetal development. Programming may be impacted by the mother's diet, and the implications of these changes can persist throughout a child's life.

Animal studies show that inadequate maternal nutrition can negatively impact the expression of various genes, the development of tissues and organs, and can be linked to permanent hypertension in offspring. Maternal nutrition extends beyond caloric intake. It encompasses a wide range of elements, like the balance of macronutrients including proteins, carbohydrates, and fatty acids, each having a unique effect on fetal growth. Deficiencies in a mother's diet can send signals to the fetus suggesting that its long-term living conditions will be those of poverty. Consequently, the baby adapts by changing its body size and metabolism to prepare for harsh conditions of food shortages after birth. Physiological and metabolic processes in the body undergo permanent changes as a result of restricted growth. When the living conditions switch from malnutrition to those of abundance, the baby is forced into an environment that works against what its body was designed for. This juxtaposition increases the baby's risk of developing diseases later in adulthood. By the same token, if the fetus growing in the womb of a healthy mother is exposed to prolonged famine after birth, the infant would be less adaptive to the harsh environment than low-birth-weight babies. Additionally, micronutrient deficiencies during pregnancy may influence the long-term outcomes related to survival and cognitive development in offspring. Although these associations are not yet fully established, they underscore the importance of adequate prenatal nutrition during this critical period.

The importance of maternal environment as it relates to fetal development has been debated. Studies show that half siblings who share a mother have more similar birth weights than those sharing a father. Other research builds on this, suggesting that over 50% of discrepancies in fetal weight can be attributed to the intrauterine environment, with the second largest contributor being the mother's genes. This research lends support to Barker's hypothesis and highlights the significance of maternal health; however, the mechanisms by which these factors (e.g., malnourishment) influence fetal weight are still under investigation.

=== Pedersen's Hypothesis – influences of maternal glucose concentration on fetal growth ===
In 1952, the Danish physician Jørgen Pedersen of the University of Copenhagen, formulated the hypothesis that maternal hyperglycemia during pregnancy might cause fetal hyperglycemia, thus exposing the fetus to elevated insulin levels. This would result in an increased risk of fetal macrosomia and neonatal hypoglycemia.

The blood glucose concentration in humans is mainly dependent on diet, especially energy-ingestion and the percentage of carbohydrates in the diet. High glucose concentrations in the blood of pregnant women cause an intensified transfer of nutrient to the fetus, increasing fetal growth. Studies could link higher maternal glucose to an increase in infant birth weight as well as different extents of morbidity, among other things the incidence of congenital malformations, supporting the Hypothesis, that even moderately increased blood glucose in the absence of diabetes positively influences growth in the fetus.

Subsequently, alterations of Pedersen's Hypothesis took place: Nutrients other than sugar and their linkage to fetal overgrowth in diabetic pregnancy were taken into account, too, but the crucial role of the fetal hyperinsulinism and monitoring of motherly glucose was nevertheless stressed. Recent studies pointed out that diabetes in the mother could foster even more lasting effects on the child's health than previously thought, even raising the risk of obesity and type 2 diabetes.

== Historical Cases ==
Various nutritional conditions, both times of scarcity and of abundance occurred time and again in different societies at different times, and thus in some cases epidemiological studies have exposed a correlation between the nutritional status of pregnant women and the health of their children or even grandchildren.

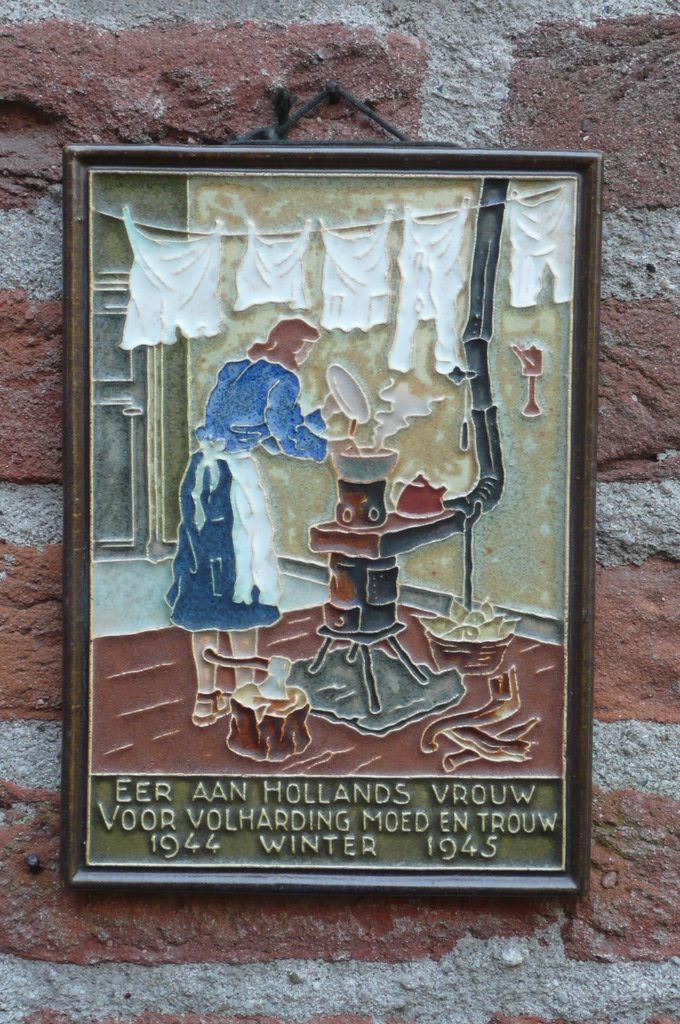
A tile tribute to the Dutch Famine

=== The Dutch Famine ===
Since low birth weight is associated with an increased risk of chronic diseases in later life, and inadequate maternal nutrition during pregnancy can contribute to restricted fetal growth, maternal under-nutrition may play a role in influencing long-term health outcomes.

The Dutch famine of 1944 or the "Hunger Winter" during World War II serves as an epidemiological study that is used to examine the effects of maternal under-nutrition during different gestational stages. This famine occurred over approximately five to six months in the western Netherlands and involved a significant reduction in food availability. The famine was imposed on a previously well-nourished population and the official daily ration for the general adult population gradually decreased from 1800 calories in December 1943 to 1400 calories in October 1944 to below 1000 calories in the late November 1944. Between December 1944 and April 1945, caloric intake further declined to approximately 400–800 calories per day. Although pregnant and lactating women were allocated additional food, these supplies became limited during the peak of the famine. In the early May 1945, the liberation of the Netherlands restored the food supply. The daily ration had increased to more than 2000 calories in June 1945. What distinguishes the Dutch famine as a study context is the well-defined time frame and geographic location, as well as the abrupt onset and resolution of food scarcity in a previously well-nourished population.

Research has linked maternal malnutrition during this period with limited intrauterine growth and an increased risk of chronic diseases in offspring later in life, including coronary heart disease. These observations are consistent with Barker's hypothesis, which suggests that early nutritional environments may have long-term effects on health outcomes.

=== The French Paradox ===
The French paradox regards the seemingly paradoxical fact that people living in France since many generations suffer from a relatively little incidence of heart disease, although the traditional French cuisine is high in saturated fatty acids.

One explanation suggested for the paradox is the potential impact of nutritional enhancements during pregnancy and the first months and years of life that would positively influence the health of following generations: After the defeat in the Franco-German War, a nutrition program for pregnant women and small children with the aim of strengthening future generations of soldiers was introduced by the French Government. This might be one explanation for positive health-outcomes in following generations. Other research indicates the potential influence of psychological and cultural factors regarding lower coronary heart disease deaths. Compared to other countries, college students in France associate food least with health and most with pleasure, which may lead to more positive attitudes surrounding food. Preliminary research suggests these French perspectives may correlate with a lower risk of developing preclinical stages of CHD. However, not all research supports these connections.

== Recommendations for Pregnant Women ==
=== Gestation stages ===
Gestation is the period of embryo development from conception to birth. Gestation is about 40 weeks in humans and is divided into three trimesters, each spanning 3 months. Gestational stages, on the other hand, are based on physiological fetal development, which include the germinal stage, embryonic stage and fetal stage.

Germinal stage is the stage from fertilization to about 2 weeks. The fertilized egg or the zygote becomes a blastocyst where the outer layer and the inner cell mass differentiate to form placenta and the fetus respectively. Implantation occurs at this stage where the blastocyst becomes buried in the endometrium.

Embryonic stage is approximately from 2 weeks to 8 weeks. It is also in this stage where the blastocyst develops into an embryo, where all major features of humans are present and operational by the end of this stage.

Fetal stage is from 9 weeks to term. During this period of time, the embryo develops rapidly and becomes a fetus. Pregnancy becomes visible at this stage.

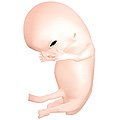
Embryo at 8 weeks after fertilization

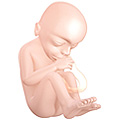
Fetus at 18 weeks after fertilization

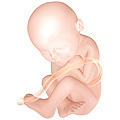
Fetus at 38 weeks after fertilization

=== Pre-pregnancy weight and gestational weight gain ===
BMI chart.

The pattern and amount of weight gain is closely associated with gestational stages. Additional energy is required during pregnancy due to the expansion of maternal tissues and stored to support fetal development.

In the first trimester (blastogenesis and early embryonic stages), the mother experiences a minimal weight gain (approximately 0.5-2 kilograms), while the embryo weighs only 6 grams.

In the second trimester and third trimester (late embryonic and fetal stages), the fetus undergoes rapid weight growth and the weight increases to about 3000~4000 grams. It is also in this period that the mother experiences the bulk of her gestational weight gain but the amount of weight gain varies greatly. The amount of weight gain depends strongly on their pre-pregnant weight.

Generally, a normal weight is strongly recommended for mothers when entering gestation, as it promotes overall health of infants. Maternal body weight is determined by the Body Mass Index (BMI) which is defined as the weight in kilograms divided by the square of the height in meters. While pregnant, body weight should be managed within the recommended gestational weight gain range as it is shown to have a positive effect on pregnancy outcomes. Gestational weight gain should also be progressive and the recommended weight depends on pre-pregnant body weight.

Since the total weight gain depends on pre-pregnant body weight, it is recommended that underweight women should undergo a larger weight gain for healthy pregnancy outcomes, and overweight or obese women should undergo a smaller weight gain.

==== Normal Weight for Women ====
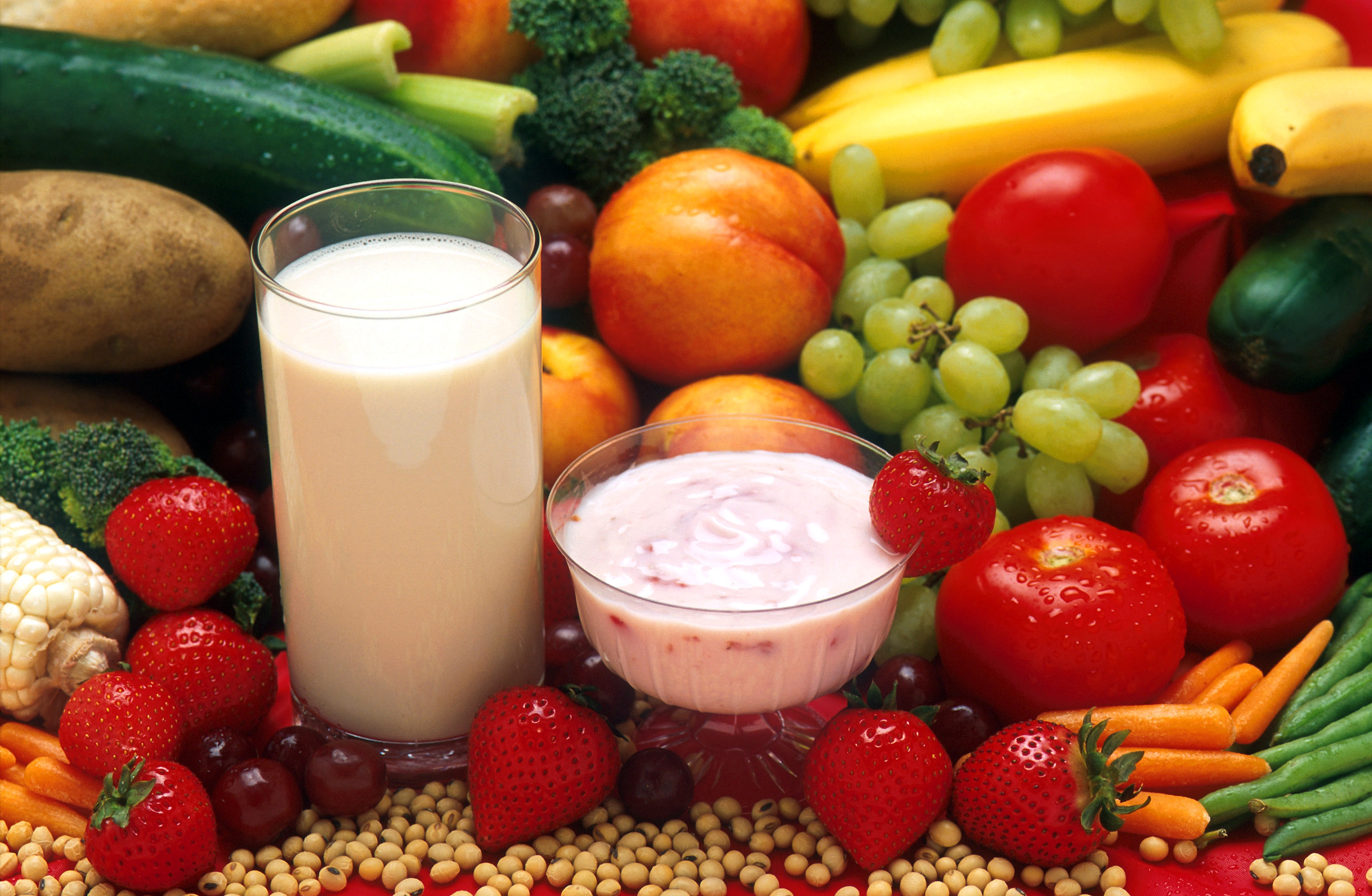
Health choices such as low-fat milk and alternatives, fruits, and vegetables should be emphasized for pregnant women.

Women having a BMI of 18.5~24.9 are classified as having a normal or healthy body weight. This group has the lowest risk of adverse birth outcomes. Their babies are least likely to either be low-birth weight or high-birth weight. It is advised that women with a normal weight before pregnancy should gain a total of 11.5 kilograms to 16.0 kilograms throughout gestation, which is approximately 0.4 kilogram per week in the second and third trimesters.

In order to maintain a steady weight gain, the mother should engage in mild physical activities. Participating in aerobic activities such as walking and swimming 3 to 4 times a week is usually adequate. Vigorous physical activity is not recommended since an excessive loss of calories is induced which is not sufficient to support fetal development.

A proper diet is also essential to healthy weight gain. The common saying "a woman is eating for two" often leads to mothers thinking that they should eat twice as much. In reality, only a small increase in caloric intake is needed to provide for the fetus; approximately 350 calories more in the second trimester and 450 calories more in the third trimester. Also, healthy choices should be emphasized for these extra calories such as whole grain products, fruits and vegetables as well as low-fat dairy alternatives.

==== Underweight Women ====
Women are classified as underweight if they have a pre-pregnant BMI of 18.5 or below. Low pre-pregnancy BMI increases the risk of low birth weight infants, but the risk can be balanced by an appropriate gestational weight gain from 12.5 to 18.0 kilograms in total, or about 0.5 kilogram each week in the second and third trimesters.

Underweight women usually have inadequate nutrient stores that are not enough to provide for both herself and the fetus. While exercise and a proper diet are both needed to maintain the recommended weight gain, a balance between the two is very important. As such, underweight mothers should seek individualized advice tailored especially for themselves.

==== Overweight and Obese Women ====
Women with a high pre-pregnancy weight are classified as overweight or obese, defined as having a BMI of 25 or above. Women with BMI between 25 and 29.9 are in the overweight category and should gain between 7.0 and 11.5 kilograms in total, corresponding to approximately 0.28 kilogram each week during the second and third trimesters. Whereas women with BMI of 30 or above are in the obese category and should gain only between 5.0 and 9.0 kilograms overall, which equates to roughly 0.2 kilogram per week in the second and third trimesters.

Diet, exercise or a combination of both has been seen to reduce weight gain in pregnancy by 20% and reduce high blood pressure. Diet with exercise may reduce the risk of caesarean section, having a large baby and having a baby with serious breathing problems. Diet and exercise help pregnant women not gain too much weight during pregnancy when compared with giving the women no help to control weight gain or routine care (usually one session in the pregnancy).

In general, walking is encouraged for mothers classified in this category. Unfortunately, estimated energy requirements for them are not available. As such, they are encouraged to record activity and intake level. This can be done with the help of tools such as My Food Guide Servings Tracker from Health Canada and EATracker that are available online. In extreme cases where the BMI exceeds 35, help from a registered dietitian is recommended.

==== Summary Table ====
The following table summarizes the recommended rate of weight gain and total weight gain according to pre-pregnancy Body Mass Index (BMI) for singleton pregnancies. The first column categorizes the type of body weight based on the BMI. The second column summarizes the total recommended weight gain for each type of body weight, and the third column presents the corresponding weekly weight gain during the period when the fetus undergoes rapid growth (during second and third trimesters). In extreme cases, the amount of total and weekly weight gain can vary by a factor of two depending on a woman's pre-pregnant weight. For example, a woman in the obese category is recommended to gain a total of 5~9 kilograms, whereas an underweight woman needs to gain up to 18 kilograms in weight.

| Pre-pregnancy BMI Category | Recommendated Total Weight Gain | Weekly Weight Gain (after 12 weeks) |
|---|---|---|
| Underweight BMI <18.5 | 12.5~18 kg (28~40 lb) | 0.5 kg (1.0 lb) |
| Healthy weight BMI 18.5~ 24.9 | 11.5~16 kg (25~35 lb) | 0.4 kg (1.0 lb) |
| Overweight BMI 25.0~ 29.9 | 7.0~ 11.5 kg (15~25 lb) | 0.3 kg (0.6 lb) |
| Obese BMI ≥ 30 | 5.0~9.0 kg (11~20 lb) | 0.2 kg (0.5 lb) |

== Recommendations for Low and High Birth Weight ==
=== Diagnosis ===
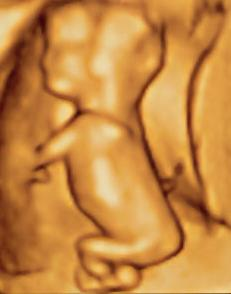
Ultrasound of fetus (~3 inches in length).

To have a good estimate of birth weight, ultrasonography or ultrasound during pregnancy and the date of last menstrual period are needed. Measured values from ultrasonography are compared with the growth chart to estimate fetal weight.

Crown-rump length can be used as the best ultrasonographic measurement for correct diagnosis of gestational age during the first trimester. This correlation between crown-rump length and gestational age would be most effectively shown when no growth defects are observed in the first trimester. If growth defects were observed in the first trimester, then the measurement of the date of last menstrual period becomes quite important since the crown-heel length has become less of a reliable indicator of gestational age.

After the 20th week of pregnancy, the mother would need to visit the doctor for the measurement of fundal height, which is the length from the top portion of the uterus to the pubic bone. The length measured in centimeters should correspond to the number of weeks that the mother has been pregnant. If the measured number is higher or lower than 2 centimeters, further tests using ultrasound would be needed to check the results. Another way to estimate fetal size is to look at the mother's weight gain. How much weight the mother gains can be used to indicate fetal size.

=== Low Birth Weight ===
Birth weight chart.

There are two ways to determine small for gestational age (SGA) infants. Many research studies agree that SGA babies are those with birth weight or crown-heel length measured at two standard deviations or more below the mean of the infant's gestational age, based on data consisting of a reference population. Other studies classify SGA babies as those with birth weight values below the 10th percentile of the growth chart for babies of the same gestational age. This indicates that these babies are weighing less than 90% of babies of the same gestational age.

Many factors, including maternal, placental, and fetal factors, contribute to the cause of impaired fetal growth. There are several maternal factors, which include age, nutritional status, alcohol use, smoking, and medical conditions. Insufficient uteroplacental perfusion is an example of a placental factor. Chromosomal abnormalities and genetic diseases are examples of fetal factors.

Complications for the infant include limitations in body growth since the number and size of cells in tissues is smaller. The infant likely did not receive enough oxygen during pregnancy so the oxygen level is low. It is also more difficult to maintain body temperature since there is less blood flow within the small body.

As such, it is necessary to monitor oxygen level to make sure that it doesn't go too low. If the baby can't suck well, then it may be necessary for tube-feed. Since the baby cannot maintain body temperature sufficiently, a temperature-controlled bed would help to keep their bodies from losing heat. There are ways to help prevent SGA babies. Monitoring fetal growth can help identify the problem during pregnancy well before birth. It would be beneficial to seek professional help and counseling.

=== High Birth Weight ===
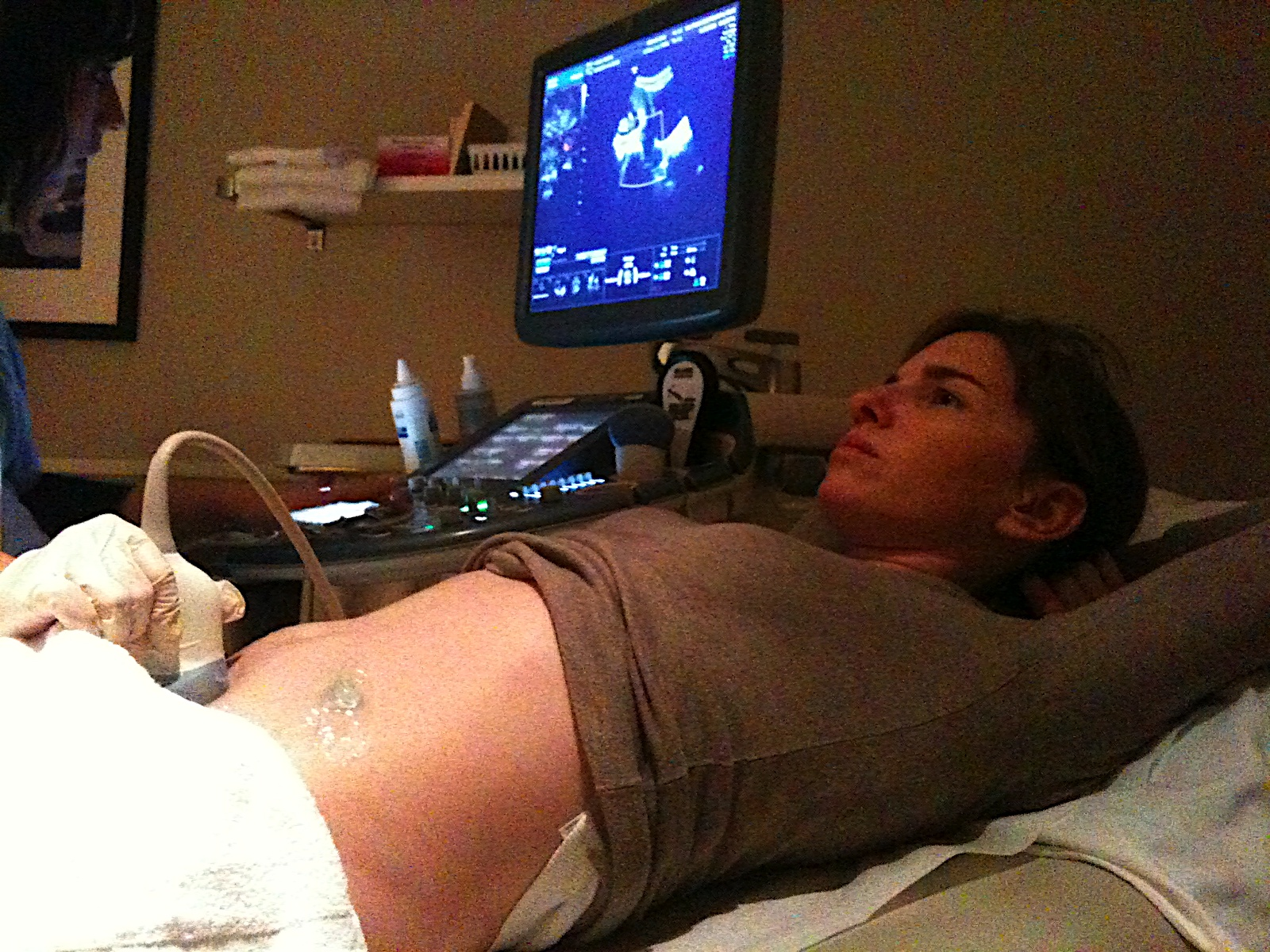
Ultrasound examination.

Research shows that when birth weights of infants are greater than the 90th percentile of the growth chart for babies of the same gestational age, they are considered large for gestational age or LGA. This is known as macrosomia, indicating the baby weighs more than 90% of others at the same gestational age.

Many factors account for LGA babies, including genetics and excessive nutrient supply. It seems that a common factor for LGA babies is whether or not the mother has diabetes when she is pregnant. There are many complications associated with mothers who deliver LGA babies, and excessive growth increases the changes of an early delivery and Caesarean section. Post-birth, the infant is at a higher risk of hypoglycemia (low glucose levels in the blood) and difficulty breathing.

To avoid excessive fetal growth, it is important mother's attend regular check-ups with their obstetrician to track their health status and detect signs of gestational diabetes. For diabetic mothers, careful management of diabetes during pregnancy period will also lower the risk of birthing a LGA baby.

== Research ==
=== Malnutrition and the Placenta ===
The placenta may adapt to maternal malnutrition in an effort to support fetal development and protect against adverse nutritional exposures. In pregnant mice, undernutrition and high fat diets have been shown to alter both placental size and structure, including the expression of key transport systems. Placentae from mothers fed a high fat diet appeared to adapt to excessive nutrient supply, while placentae from undernourished mothers were less mature with impaired transport. These placental adaptations could help to explain why offspring from malnourished pregnancies experience altered growth.

== An Intersectional Evaluation ==
As more research has been generated to determine the importance of prenatal health and nutrition, scientists have begun connecting these biological concepts to social ecosystems around the globe.

Adequate prenatal nutrition is only possible if pregnant women have access to healthy and affordable food options, as well as the education to implement a sufficient diet. In many low-income countries, women often face challenges in meeting the increased micronutrient demands associated with pregnancy, largely due to persistent dietary inadequacies. Compounding this issue, the financial and logistical barriers to assessing biochemical indicators of individual micronutrients have resulted in limited population-level data on deficiencies during pregnancy. This gap in knowledge has been termed 'hidden hunger,' reflecting both the unrecognized scale of the problem and its potential consequences.

This lack of data is not unique to lower income communities, but is also evident in high-income countries. However, the available information shows that clinical micronutrient deficiencies during pregnancy are relatively uncommon in high-income countries. This disparity is often linked to factors such as consistent dietary diversity, access to nutritional counseling during pregnancy, the availability of fortified foods, and the routine use of antenatal micronutrient supplements.

The in utero environment is affected by more than just prenatal nutrition, rather, it depends on the overall health of the mother. Health is defined by a wide range physiological and genetic conditions, and some scientists claim these too are not immune to the impacts of social inequities. While race is widely considered to be a social construct, some researchers argue that the effects of racism and systemic oppression have transformed this label into something more tangible. Different racial groups confer unique advantages and disadvantages depending on the context with which they are analyzed. Inequalities experienced by communities have the potential to be passed down through generations, creating a positive feedback loop that results in poorer health outcomes. Those subjected to racism are more vulnerable to hypertension, diabetes, and stroke, all of which negatively impact the in utero environment and, therefore, future health of offspring. These all pose health risks to the mother and fetus, evident by variations in birth-weight discussed above.

These ideas seem to support Barker's hypothesis, which claims that the maternal environment is essential for proper fetal growth and health after birth. Other research has evaluated the birth weights for U.S.-born black women, African-born black women, and U.S.-born white women. The results indicate a lower average weight for U.S.-born black women, compared to the higher and relative equal averages of African-born black women and U.S-born white women. These data suggest there is a biological element of race, and one that may persist throughout life, manifesting as chronic illness in adulthood. When these children have their own children, the effects are passed down and the cycle continues.

The interplay between these social factors, genetic variations, and environmental variables, like prenatal nutrition, still presents many unknowns that must be explored.

== Future Direction for Research ==
It is reasonable to expect higher weight gain for multiple gestations. Recommendations for women carrying twins are given, but more research should be done to precisely determine the total weight gain, as these ranges are wide. Also, the ranges for underweight women carrying twins is unknown. There is not enough information to recommend weight gain cutoffs and guidelines for women carrying three or more babies, women of short stature (<157 centimeters), and pregnant teens.

Estimated energy requirements (EER) for overweight/obese women are also unavailable, which makes it challenging for people in this category to properly track and adjust their diets and weight gain. There are also important links between nutrition and mental health across pregnancy. For example, a woman experiencing low mood may be more likely to smoke, use alcohol or neglect her diet, all of which pose threats to fetal growth and development (before and after birth).

Current dietary reference intakes are generally based on data from healthy individuals, offering limited insights into the needs of pregnant women, particularly those with pre-existing deficiencies. Further research is necessary to explore the impact of micronutrient supplementation during the preconception period and to refine dietary recommendations. Strengthening pregnancy-specific data and standardizing its interpretation will be essential to accurately assess deficiency risks and enhance nutritional guidelines for both individuals and populations.

== Practical Advice for Mothers ==
Maintaining a healthy and steady weight gain during pregnancy promotes the overall health of both the mother and child, and reduces the incidence of prenatal morbidity and mortality. The total recommended pregnancy weight gain depends on pre-pregnant body weight, and weight issues should be addressed before pregnancy.

Since conditions during pregnancy will have long-term effects on adult health, "moderation" should be considered for both dietary and physical activity recommendations. Eating a balanced diet and maintaining physical activity that matches the energy needs from food consumed is optimal for health pregnancy results. Drinking enough fluids, especially water, supports increases in blood volume during pregnancy and prevents dehydration and constipation. Limiting the consumption of food and beverages high in sugar, sodium, and calories can help pregnant women maintain a healthy weight. It is also recommended to accompany regular meals with a daily prenatal vitamin supplement that has sufficient folic acid and iron content.

If the fetus is predicted to have a low birth weight, it may be beneficial to increase caloric intake, which can be done by implementing extra Food Guide Servings daily. If the fetus is predicted to have high birth weight, smaller and more frequent meals should be consumed as a means of weight management.

== See also ==
- Smoking and pregnancy
- Nutrition and pregnancy
- Fetal Origins Hypothesis
- Fetal Programming
- Pregnancy
- Child development
