= Clinical endocannabinoid deficiency syndrome =

Medical theory

Clinical endocannabinoid deficiency (CECD) is a medical theory that proposes that a deficiency of endocannabinoids is the underlying pathophysiology of migraines, fibromyalgia, and irritable bowel syndrome. The deficiency may sometimes start in the womb as a result of maternal obesity.

The nature of the syndrome and existence of CECD as a clinically meaningful condition have been called into question by those who wish to roll back legal access.

The theory goes that anandamide - which is one of the body's primary neurotransmitters, responsible for regulatory functions of the other neurotransmitters via the endocannabinoid system, is deficient in people with the condition.

Evidence suggests that infants that did not get enough anandamide via breast milk were not able to fully develop their endocannabinoid system.

Symptoms of the conditions range from allergic reactions to food, in the form of asthma and skin eruptions, to swollen lymph nodes and arthritis.

It’s thought that many autoimmune conditions could actually be attributed to CECD, although further research does need to be conducted.
