= Maternal fetal stress transfer =

Physiological phenomenon of transfer of stress to foetus during pregnancy

Stress is described as the brain's biochemical response to a stressful stimuli. Maternal fetal stress transfer is a physiological phenomenon in which maternal stress experienced during pregnancy is transferred to the fetus via the placenta. This transfer causes an imbalance of hormones and affecting the fetal development due to fetal programming. The main biological system responding to stress is the HPA axis. According to recent studies, these implications of the HPA axis dysfunction are mainly the result of two particular stress hormones circulating in the maternal blood supply: cortisol and catecholamines. Additionally, as we know there is a link of blood supply between the mother and a fetus via the placenta, which is a sexually dimorphic organ.

== Mechanism of action and Biological pathway ==
Cortisol is type of hormone called a glucocorticoid, which is the main stress hormone in the body and tends to be activated during a fight-or-flight response. Cortisol is produced in the adrenal gland, which is further mediated by the hypothalamus and pituitary glands in the brain. Together, the collective signaling of the hypothalamus, pituitary gland, and adrenal gland is known as the hypothalamo-pituitary-adrenal (HPA) axis. During periods of high stress, cortisol is released, leading to physiological manifestations of stress such as increased maternal blood pressure (MBP) and maternal heart rate (MHR).

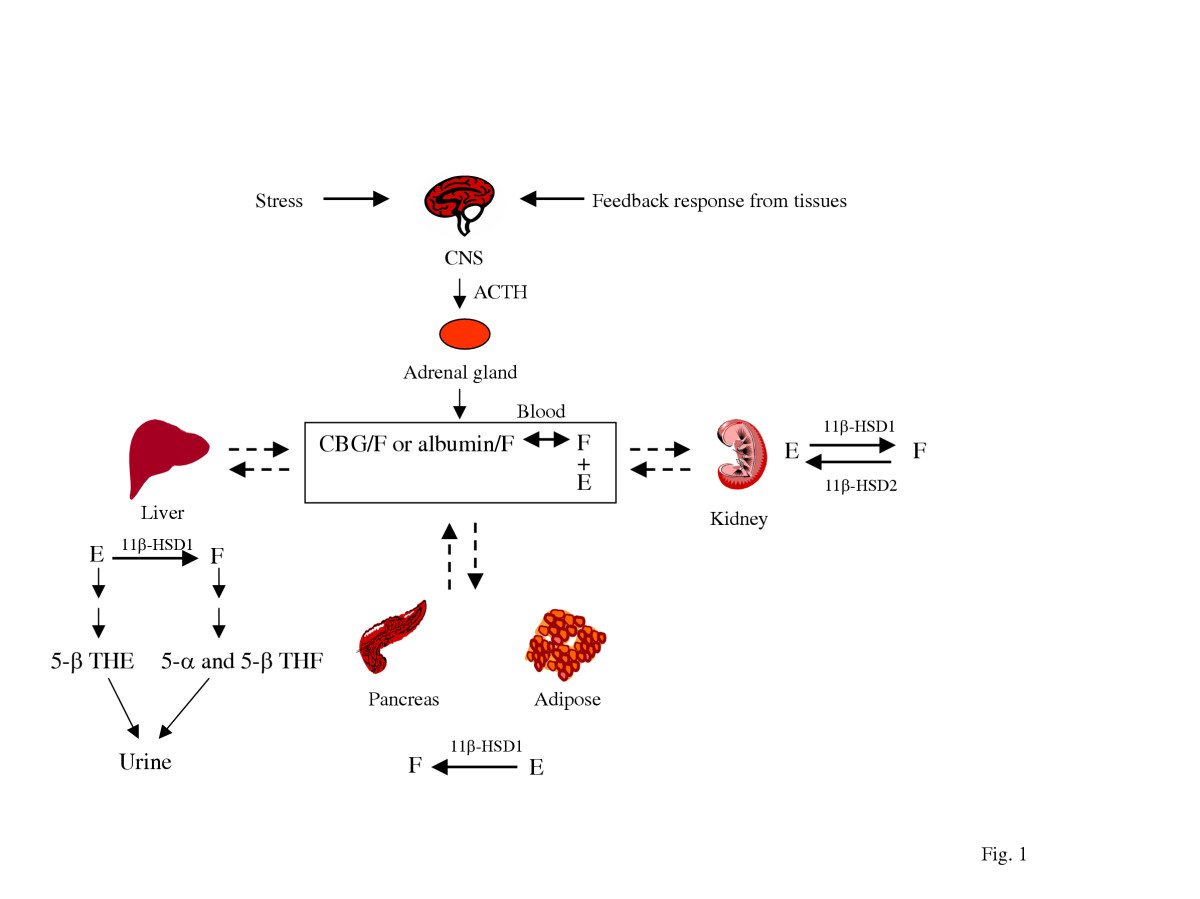
Fig 2. Summary of the regulation of glucocorticoids via the adrenal glands. Summary of the regulation of glucocorticoids via the adrenal glands.

== Role of the Placenta ==
In the case of a pregnant woman, the release of cortisol from the adrenal glands also has an effect on the fetus being carried in the womb. Cortisol is a steroid hormone, and, like all steroid hormones, the receptors for cortisol are located intracellularly. In other words, cortisol does not need an extracellular receptor in order to enter the nucleus of cells and affect their gene expression. Because of this feature of steroid hormones, cortisol diffuses directly across the placenta, the barrier that separates the fetus from the mother. The placenta converts excess cortisol to cortisone, by the use of 11βhydroxysteroid dehydrogenase type 2 (HSD11B2). The presence of HSD11B2 is reportedly 14.2% in females, and 9.5% in males. In a mice study, when male and female mice were exposed to chronic stress during gestation, only the males showed an increase response to stress

High levels of fetal cortisol induce higher CRH expression in the paraventricular nucleus of the hypothalamus (PVN) and the central nucleus of the amygdala. In other words, excessive cortisol crossing the placental barrier causes the hypothalamus and amygdala to increase transcription of CRH, which in turn stimulates HPA axis activity early in postnatal life. With such an overactive HPA axis, glucocorticoid receptor expression in the brain increases, making it so that the release of minimal levels of cortisol elicit a substantial response at developing synapses. It is speculated that the HPA axis will more rapidly develop its neural circuitry as a result.

== Genes and Sexual Dimorphism ==
Females have the XX genes, whereas male fetus contain the XY genes. As females have an additional X chromosome, one of them is inactivated to avoid doubling the production and synthesis of X-linked genes, but some genes are able to escape this inactivation . Hence, we can build on the argument that the sexual dimorphic mechanism of the placenta's can be because few genes escaped the X chromosome deactivation leading to the double expression of 2 X-linked genes in the female placenta after one X chromosome is inactivated. Specifically, the X-linked gene O-linked N-acetylglucosamine transferase(OGT) is able to escape X inactivation

Neonatal testosterone primarily affects hormone-insulin growth factor I (GH-IGF-1). GH-IGF-1modulates 3 genes: SerpinA6, Hsd11b1, and Srd5a1, which further impacts the development of the HPA axis. A study measured genes which played a key role in maternal-fetal stress transmission (HSD11B2, NR3C1, NR3C2). The results showed that except for GLUT1, all other genes were higher in female than male placentas.

== Placental Protective Mechanism ==
During the pregnancy, a foetus' brain is extremely malleable as it is in its prime developmental phase. The parts of the brain which are most susceptible to extraneous influences are those responsible for the stress response: the hypothalamus and the pituitary gland. This is due to the fact that the stress response in humans forms very early in our foetal stage, therefore is vulnerable to the mother's mental, physical and emotional state during the gestational period.

If the mother herself experiences unusually high levels of stress, her body would respond by increasing cortisol levels to an abnormal standing. These hormones would then be passed from the mother's bloodstream into the foetus'. The reason that this phenomenon only occurs when the mother is experiencing an excessive amount of stress, and does not occur from the usual, everyday stress that many individuals experience, is due to one protective mechanism that takes place in the placenta.

This mechanism can be understood by first comparing cortisol concentrations in mother and foetus.

Cortisol concentrations in the mother are five to ten times higher than the concentration in the foetus. This ratio of maternal : foetus cortisol concentration is maintained by an enzyme in the placenta which alters the cortisol molecule into an inactive metabolite (11-keto products), called Placental 11 β-hydroxysteroid-dehydrogenase. The problem lies in the multiplying factor arising from this ratio, i.e., if maternal cortisol levels rise by 10-20% it could cause foetal cortisol levels to double, which is what occurs when the mother experiences psychological distress. Additionally, persistent antenatal stress experienced toward the end of the gestation period is shown to inflict severe and permanent damage on the foetus' physiological development, potentially leading to early growth retardation, aka intrauterine growth restriction, preterm labour and delayed motor development in infancy.

Studying the foetal stress response in vivo is not commonly done due to various ethical considerations, but the few studies which have managed to conduct research into this phenomenon during a human pregnancy have reached similar conclusions. This is that maternal-foetal stress transfer occurs through the mechanism of cortisol moving from mother to baby through the placenta. This means that a mother's stress levels become her child's stress levels as she passes down her own over-sensitive stress response, through non-genetic means.

== External stress stimuli and the Fetus ==
=== Alcohol ===
This biological phenomena is problematic due to the impact that an increased level of cortisol has on the foetal HPA axis. The major source of a cortisol increase are stimuli which provoke consistently high levels of psychosocial stress, but another source of high cortisol concentrations that is often overlooked is the ingestion of alcohol. It is already well known that women who drink alcohol during pregnancy are more likely to give birth to children with physical or neurological defects, but this occurs with large amounts of alcohol intake. Smaller but still significant portions of alcohol intake can trigger a rise in cortisol levels in the mother's bloodstream, hence causing the cortisol levels to rise in the foetus as well, resulting in the same consequences as maternal-foetal stress transfer.

=== Obesity ===
Obesity later in life is linked to the changes in the HPA-axis activity in the fetus. As mothers experience increased stress, they may begin to participare in risky health behaviors such as poor dietary habits. This increases the chance of obesity in the mother and the fetus. The fetus has an increased chance of obesity as high stress is used to predict the potential environment the fetus lives in. Two specific types of glucocorticoids, dexamethasone and betamethasone, are transferred to the fetus. CRH as well, also influences the fetus' health and disease.This exposure, in addition to a higher energy diet, increase the likelihood of obesity later on in life. This is due to glucocorticoids not only regulating stress in the fetus, but also appetite, obesity and metabolism in animals and humans.

== Consequences and Long-Term Effects ==
A mother's antenatal stress is correlated with detrimental neurobehavioural outcomes in the child. There are a myriad of consequences on a child after birth, such as psychiatric disorders, behavioural abnormalities, dysfunctional emotional regulation and delays in motor production.

Exposure during important neurodevelopment periods increase risk of metabolic disorders including obesity, Type 2 diabetes, and a poor lipid profile. This risk is most present at a later stage of pregnancy and can be seen as early as six months of age. The likelihood further increases when children experience high levels of stress.

The most commonly occurring psychiatric disorders which develop are attention-deficit / hyperactivity disorder, minor depressive and neurotic symptoms, schizophrenia, a tendency toward alcoholism/drug-addiction and criminal behaviour. These psychiatric disorders can, in turn, either lead to or exacerbate behavioural irregularities such as hyperactivity, an unusually low threshold for irritation or frustration, antisocial and inconsiderate behaviour, as well as profuse clinging or crying (especially at a younger age). Furthermore, the feminisation of male behaviour and an increase in timidity has also been observed in children born out of a stressful antenatal environment.

Biologically speaking, this phenomenon can also cause the hippocampus, a very important component of the stress response, to be defective and not function as it should. The reason being that the hippocampus is one of the parts of the brain which is seen to be most vulnerable to maternal stress hormones. Some may believe that this physiological consequence of maternal-foetal stress transfer can be said to be the cause of the psychiatric disorders and behavioural abnormalities outlined above, alongside other factors.

Moreover, an overexposure to cortisol during infancy can lead to the extreme response of desensitisation to cortisol in the child. Desensitisation or the blocking of cortisol receptors can occur because of irregularities in the HPA axis, which form in utero due to the passing of cortisol through the placenta from mother to baby. The conversion from extremely high to low cortisol levels can be said to be a defence mechanism of sorts, as one (unconsciously) experiences withdrawal, avoidance and denial in an effort to disengage with any challenging or discomforting stimuli, sometimes manifesting in alexithymia. People are often left feeling empty and isolated due to their state of emotional numbness and dissociation.

The continuity of maternal stress from during, to after, pregnancy is a progression of maternal-foetal stress transfer which is significant in impacting the infant's overall wellbeing. Postnatal maternal stress, such as postpartum depression, has an enormous impact on the emotion, mental and behavioural growth of a child, hence can aggravate and intensify the impacts of maternal-foetal stress transfer. Roughly 13% of women experience at least one depressive episode during or directly after pregnancy, thus encouraging the increased interest in identifying the effects of antenatal maternal stress on the development of an individual during the foetal and infancy stages of life.

== Reversal of Consequences ==
As stated by epigenetics and one of the conclusions of the nature vs. nurture debate, most behavioural and psychological problems arise due to a combination of biological and environmental/sociocultural factors. Therefore, environmental factors such as parental care and nutritional availability, alongside help given to the child such as psychotherapy can aid in the reversal of the impacts of maternal-foetal stress transfer.

== See also ==
- Prenatal stress
- Stress (biology)
- Social stress
- Psychosocial stress
- Cortisol
- Hypothalamo-pituitary-adrenal (HPA) axis
- Placenta
- Psychological stress
