= Birth weight =

Weight of a human neonate at birth

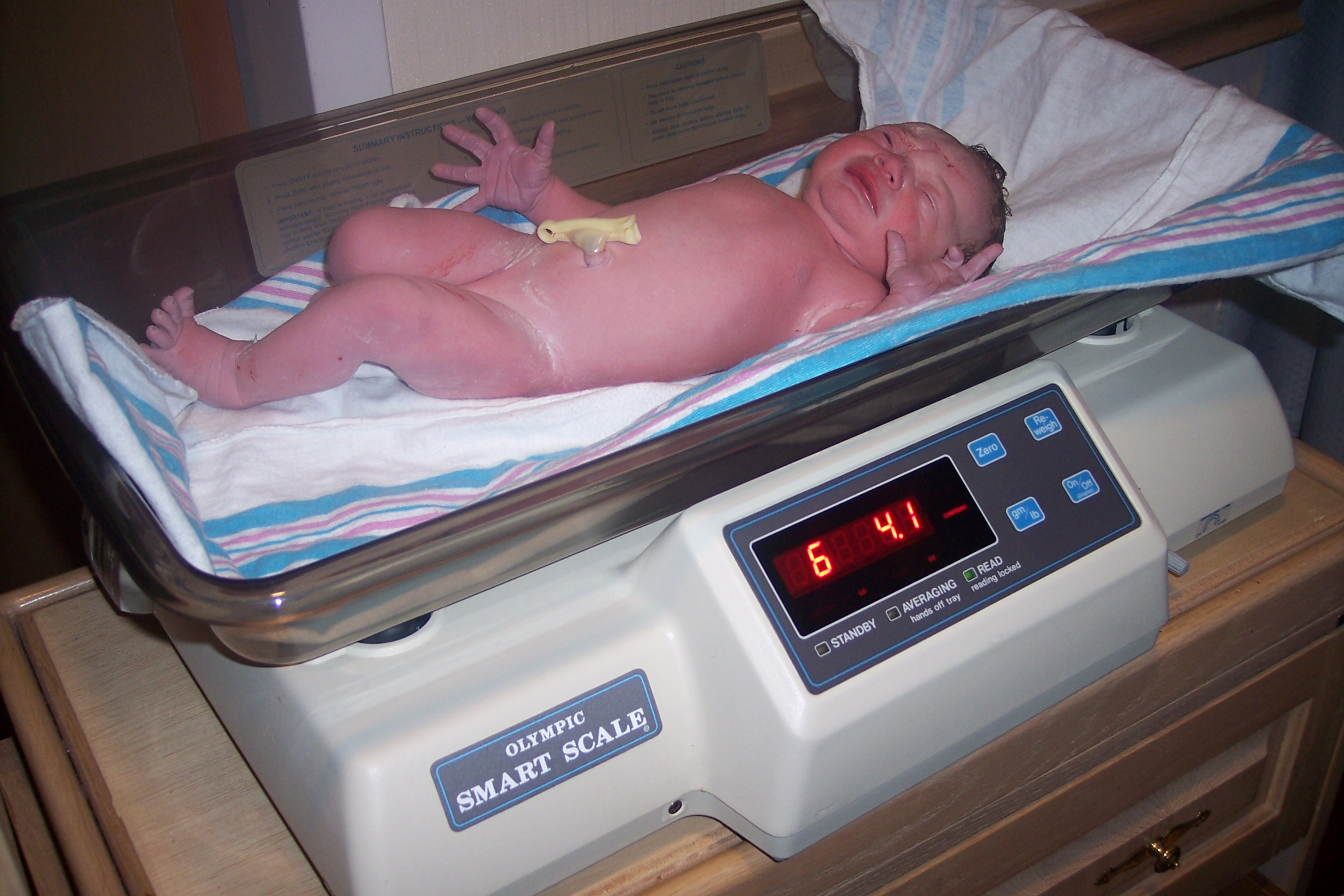
Neonate weighed as appropriate for gestational age

Birth weight is the body weight of a neonate at their birth. The average birth weight in babies of European and African descent is 3.5 kilograms (7.7 lb), with the normative range between 2.5 and 4.0 kilograms (5.5 and 8.8 lb).

15% of babies born in 2012 had a low birth weight and 14.7% in 2020. It is projected that 14.2% of newborns will have low birth weight in 2030, falling short of the 2030 Sustainable Development Goals target of a reduction of 30%.

On average, babies of Asian descent weigh about 3.25 kilograms (7.2 lb). The prevalence of low birth weight has changed over time. Trends show a slight decrease from 7.9% (1970) to 6.8% (1980), then a slight increase to 8.3% (2006), to the current levels of 8.2% (2016). The prevalence of low birth weights has trended slightly upward from 2012 to the present.

Low birth weight is associated with neonatal infection, infant mortality, as well as illness into adulthood. Numerous studies have attempted, with varying degrees of success, to show links between birth weight and later-life conditions, including diabetes, obesity, tobacco smoking, and intelligence.

== Abnormalities ==
- A low birth weight can be caused either by a preterm birth (low gestational age at birth) or the infant being small for gestational age (slow prenatal growth rate), or a combination of both. Small for gestational age is defined as below the 10th percentile for gestational age and sex. Low birth weight can also be caused by health issues in the person giving birth, genetic factors, or problems in the placenta.
- A very large birth weight is usually caused by the infant having been large for gestational age. Large birth weight can be caused by maternal health issues such as gestational diabetes and obesity. Large birth weight has been associated with significantly higher rates of neonatal morbidity.

== Determinants ==
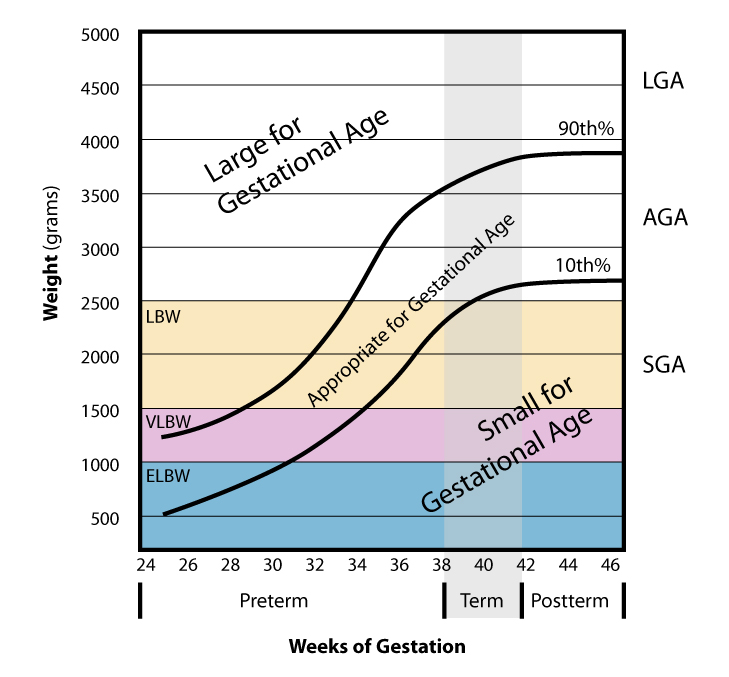
Relation of weight and gestational age

=== Genetics ===
There are two genetic loci that have been strongly linked to birth weight, ADCY5 and CCNL1, and four that show some evidence (CDKAL1, HHEX–IDE, GCK, and TCF7L2). The heritability of birth weight ranges from 25 to 40%. There is a complex relationship between a baby's genes and the maternal environment that the child is developing in. Foetal genes influence how the fetus grows in utero, and the maternal genes influence how the environment affects the growing fetus.

=== Maternal health ===
The health of the mother during the pregnancy can affect birth weight. A pre-existing disease or acquired disease in pregnancy is sometimes associated with decreased birth weight. For example, celiac disease confers an odds ratio of low birth weight of approximately 1.8. Certain medications (e.g. for high blood pressure or epilepsy) can put a mother at a higher risk for delivering a low birth weight baby. Women younger than 15 or older than 35 are at a higher risk to have a low-birth weight baby. Multiple births, where a mother has more than one child at one time, can also be a determinant in birth weight as each baby is likely to be outside the AGA (appropriate for gestational age). Multiple births put children at a higher rate to have low birth weight (56.6%) compared to children born in a single birth (6.2%). Low birth weight can also vary by maternal age. In 2008 the rate of low birth weight was the highest in babies born to women younger than 15 years old (12.4%). Women aged 40–54 had a rate of low birth weight at 11.8 percent. The lowest rates of low birth weight happened among babies whose mothers were between the ages of 25–29 years (4.4%) and 30–34 years (7.6%).

=== Stress ===
Stressful events have been demonstrated to produce significant effects on birth weight. Those mothers who have stressful events during pregnancy, especially during the first and second trimester, are at higher risk to deliver low birth weight babies. Researchers furthered this study and found that maternal stressful events that occur prior to conception have a negative impact on birth weight as well, and can result in a higher risk for preterm and lower birth weight babies. Women who experienced abuse (physical, sexual, or emotional) during pregnancy are also at increased risk of delivering a low birth weight baby. For example, in a study completed by Witt et al., those women who experienced a stressful event (i.e. death of close family member, infertility issues, separation from partner) prior to conception had 38% more of a chance to have a very low birth weight baby compared to those who had not experienced a stressful life event. Additionally, mothers with diagnosed post-traumatic stress disorder are more likely to give birth to a low birth weight infant. The theory is that stress can impact a baby based on two different mechanisms: neuroendocrine pathway or immune/inflammatory pathway. Stress causes the body to produce stress hormones called glucocorticoids that can suppress the immune system, as well as raises levels of placental corticotropin-releasing hormone (CRH) which can lead to preterm labor. These findings can pose evidence for future prevention efforts for low birth weight babies. One way to decrease rates of low birth weight and premature delivery is to focus on the health of women prior to conception through reproductive education, screening and counseling regarding mental health issues and stress, and access to primary care.

=== Racial stress ===
Non-Hispanic Blacks have the highest infant mortality rate in the United States (11.4 deaths per 1,000 live births compared to the national average of 5.9 deaths per 1,000 live births). Subsequently, there has been growing research supporting the idea of racial discrimination as a risk factor for low birth weight. In one study by Collins et al., evidence suggested that African American mothers who experienced high levels of racial discrimination were at significantly higher risk of delivering a very low-birth weight baby compared to African American mothers who had not experienced racial discrimination.

=== Environmental factors ===
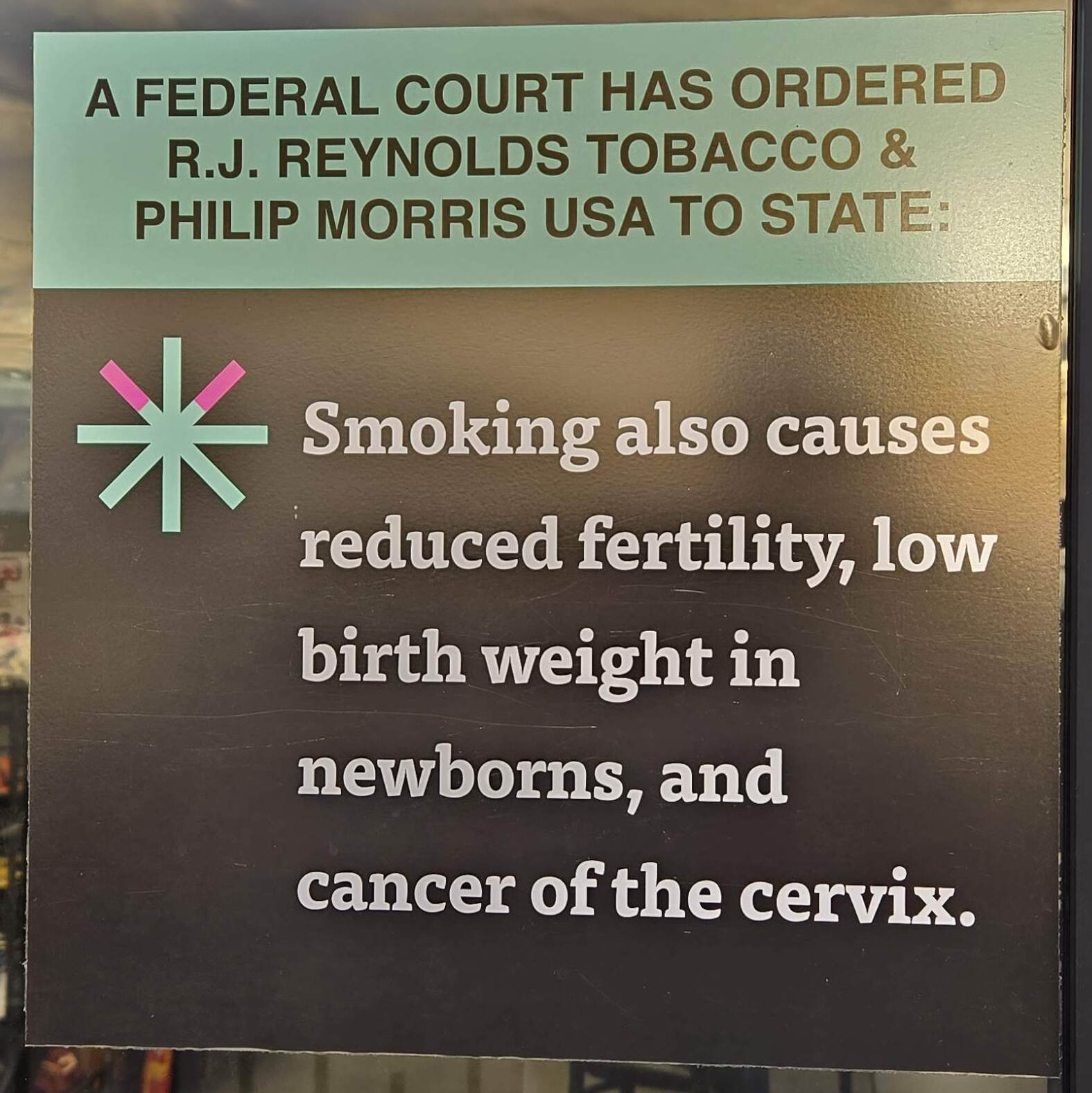
A court-ordered corrective statement: "Smoking also causes reduced fertility, low birth weight in newborns, and cancer of the cervix" (United States, 2024).

Environmental factors, including exposure of the mother to secondhand smoke can be a factor in determining the birth weight of child. In 2014, 13% of children exposed to smoke were born with low birth weight compared with 8% of those children born to nonsmokers. Children born to mothers who smoked or were exposed to secondhand smoke are more likely to develop health problems earlier in life such as neurodevelopmental delays.

When mothers actively smoke during pregnancy, their child is at a higher risk of being born with a low birth weight. Unfortunately, smoking is sometimes used as a stress management tool by expecting mothers. There is some support for lower socioeconomic status of the parents being a determinant of low birth weight, but there is conflicting evidence, as socioeconomic status is tied to many other factors.

== Neonatal care ==
Most babies admitted to the NICU are born before 37 weeks of pregnancy or have low birth weight which is less than 5.5 pounds (2.5 kg). They could also have a medical condition that requires special care. In the United States nearly half a million babies are born preterm. Because of this, many of these babies also have low birth weights. There are four levels of care in the neonatal care units: intensive care, high dependency care, low dependency, and transitional care:

- Intensive care: For babies with serious problems. This includes babies born three months early and with extremely low birth weight.
- High dependency care: For babies with less serious problems, but who still may need to be looked after or babies that are recovering from a critical illness.
- Low dependency care: For babies that do not need continuous supervision.
- Transitional care: For babies that still need medical treatment, but are well enough to be called for at their mother's bedside.

== Influence on early life ==
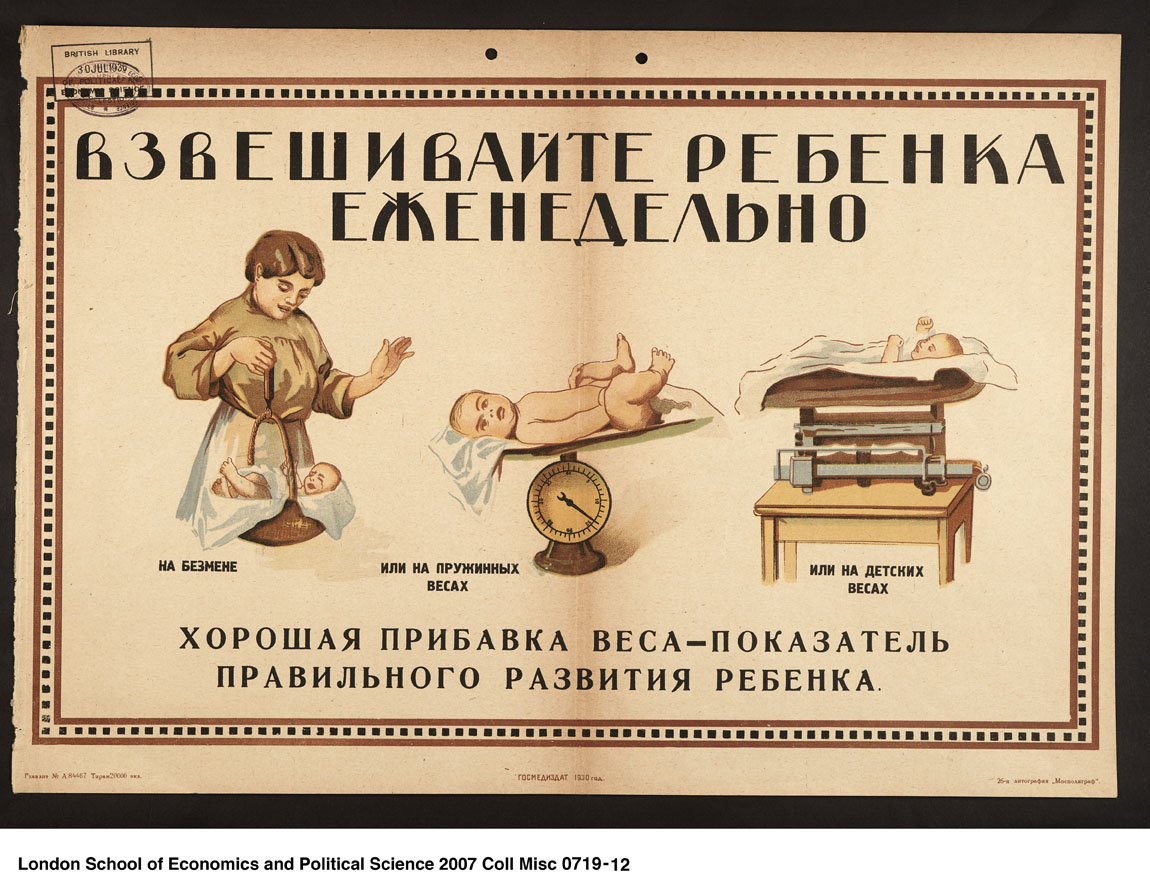
1930 poster from the Soviet Union encouraging mothers to weigh their babies weekly

Children born with an abnormally low birth weight can have significant problems within the first few years of life. They may have trouble gaining weight, obtaining adequate nutrition, and developing a strong immune system. They also have higher risks for mortality, behavior problems, and mental deficiencies. Low birth weight babies are more likely to develop the following conditions compared to normal birth weight babies:

- Breathing problems (infant respiratory distress syndrome)
- Bleeding in the brain (intraventricular hemorrhage)
- Patent ductus arteriosus (PDA)
- Necrotizing enterocolitis
- Retinopathy of prematurity
- Jaundice
- Infections

That said, the effects of low birth weight on a child's first few years of life are often intertwined with other maternal, environmental, and genetic factors and most effects of low birth weight are only slightly negatively significant on a child's life when these factors are controlled for. When these factors are taken into account, the only significant effect low birth weight has on a child's development is early physical growth and the likelihood of being underweight, compared to those with a normal birth rate.

Disability-adjusted life years out of 100,000 lost due to any cause in 2021: no data less than 23,500 23,500-31,000 31,000-38,500 38,500-46,000 46,000-53,500 53,500-61,000 61,000-68,500 68,500-76,000 more than 76,000

== Influence on adult life ==
Studies have investigated how a person's birth weight can influence their future life, including potential links with obesity, diabetes and intelligence.

A baby born small or large for gestational age (either of the two extremes) was previously thought to have an increased risk of developing obesity, but it was later found that both high birth weight and maternal BMI are associated with increased risk of developing obesity in childhood.

Growth hormone (GH) therapy at a certain dose induced catch-up of lean body mass (LBM). However, percentage body fat decreased in the GH-treated subjects. Bone mineral density SDS measured by DEXA increased significantly in the GH-treated group compared to the untreated subjects, though there is much debate over whether or not SGA (small for gestational age) is significantly adverse to children to warrant inducing catch-up. Babies that have a low birth weight are thought to have an increased risk of developing type 2 diabetes in later life. Low birth weight is linked with increase rates of obesity, insulin resistance, and type 2 diabetes and it is shown that children with the low birth weights have increased leptin levels after they catch up growth during childhood. Adiponectin levels are positively related with birth weight and BMI in babies with an increase of risk of type 2 diabetes. The leptin and adiponection mechanisms are still being studied when involving low birth weight.

== Around the world ==
15% of babies born in 2012 had a low birth weight and 14.7% in 2020. It is projected that 14.2% of newborns will have low birth weight in 2030, falling short of the 2030 Sustainable Development Goals target of a reduction of 30%. There is much variation regarding birth weight within continents, countries, and cities. Even though over 20 million babies are born each year with low birth weight, it is hard to know the exact number, as more than half of babies born in the world are not weighed at birth. The baby's weight is an indicator of the mother and baby's health. In 2013, 22 million newborns had low birth weight, around 16 percent of all babies globally. Data on low birth weight is adjusted to account for under reporting. South Asia has the highest rate of babies not weighed at birth with 66 percent, but also have the highest low birth weight, at 28 percent worldwide. West and Central Africa and least developed countries are next, with 14 percent low birth weight worldwide.

More than 96.5% of low birth weight babies are born in developing countries around the world. Because low birth weight babies can require more extensive care, it places a financial burden on communities.

== Prevention ==
The World Health Organization (WHO) recently announced an initiative to have a thirty percent reduction in low birth weight worldwide. This is a public health priority, as birth weight can have short- and long-term effects. WHO estimates that worldwide, 15–20% of all births each year are considered low birth weight, which is about 20 million births.

The start of prenatal care is very important to help prevent low birth weight and early medical problems. Going to regular doctor's visits is very important for the health of the mother and the baby. At the visits, OB/GYNs check maternal nutrition and weight gain because they are linked to the baby's weight gain. The mother having a healthy diet is essential for the baby. Maintaining good nutrition by taking folic acid, which can be found in fruits and vegetables, is linked to the prevention of premature births and low birth weight. Alcohol, cigarettes, and drugs should also be avoided during pregnancy because they can also lead to poor growth and other complications. Doctors are also able to monitor pre-existing medical illnesses to make sure they are under control during pregnancy. Mothers with high blood pressure and type 2 diabetes are more likely to have infants with low birth weights. One essential action to increase normal birth weights is to have affordable, accessible, and culturally sensitive prenatal care worldwide. This is essential not just for treating low birth weight, but also preventing it. Other prevention efforts include smoking cessation programs, food-distribution systems, stress reduction and social service supports.

== See also ==
- Infant mortality
- Low birth-weight paradox
- MOMO syndrome
- Prenatal nutrition
- Thrifty phenotype

== Sources ==
This article incorporates text from a free content work. Licensed under CC BY 4.0. Text taken from The State of Food Security and Nutrition in the World 2024, FAO, IFAD, UNICEF, WFP and WHO, FAO.

This article incorporates text from a free content work. Licensed under CC BY 4.0 (license statement/permission). Text taken from The State of Food Security and Nutrition in the World 2026, Food and Agriculture Organization of the United Nations.
