= Willem Karel Dicke =

Dutch paediatrician

Willem Karel Dicke (15 February 1905, Dordrecht – 27 April 1962, De Bilt) was a Dutch paediatrician who was the first to develop the gluten-free diet and to show that in coeliac disease some types of flour cause relapse.

== Life ==
From 1922 until 1929 Willem Dicke studied medicine in Leiden, then specialized in paediatry in Juliana Children's Hospital in Hague from 1929 until 1933. In 1936, being just 31 years old, he became the medical director of the hospital. In 1957 he was appointed a professor of Utrecht University and became a medical director of Wilhelmina Children's Hospital.

Dicke died in 1962 of cerebrovascular disease. He was considered for the 1962 Nobel Prize in Medicine, but his death that year made the discussion moot as the prizes are not awarded posthumously. The Netherlands' Society of Gastroenterology had instituted in his honor a decoration to reward the pioneering research in the field, and Willem was the first to receive the gold Dicke Medal.

== The Dutch famine of 1944–1945 ==
The discovery of the cause of coeliac disease may also be partly attributed to the Dutch famine. With wheat in very short supply there was an improvement at a children's ward of coeliac patients. Stories tell of the first precious supplies of bread being given specifically to the (no longer) sick children, prompting an immediate relapse. Thus in the 1940s Willem Dicke was able to corroborate his previously researched hypothesis that wheat intake was aggravating coeliac disease.

In the 1940s and 1950s he went on to develop the gluten-free diet, changing the way of treatment and destinies of children sick with coeliac disease.

== Works ==
- Dicke, WK (1950), Coeliakie: een onderzoek naar de nadelige invloed van sommige graansoorten op de lijder aan coeliakie (PhD thesis), Utrecht, NL: University of Utrecht
