= International Society for Developmental Origins of Health and Disease =

The International Society for Developmental Origins of Health and Disease (A International Society for DOHaD), a non-profit organization proposed by David Barker, was set up in 2003 and made up of various scientists and clinicians (31 main council members), whose main research concentration is the developmental origins of health and disease.
