= Predictive adaptive response =

A predictive adaptive response (PAR) is a developmental trajectory taken by an organism during a period of developmental plasticity in response to perceived environmental cues. This PAR does not confer an immediate advantage to the developing organism; however, if the PAR correctly anticipates the postnatal environment it will be advantageous in later life, if the environment the organism is born into differs from that anticipated by the PAR it will result in a mismatch. PAR mechanisms were first recognized in research done on human fetuses that investigated whether poor nutrition results in the inevitable diagnosis of Type 2 diabetes in later life. PARs are thought to occur through epigenetic mechanisms that alter gene expression, such as DNA methylation and histone modification, and do not involve changes to the DNA sequence of the developing organism. Examples of PARs include greater helmet development in Daphnia cucullata in response to maternal exposure to predator pheromones, rats exposed to glucocorticoid during late gestation led to an intolerance to glucose as adults, and coat thickness determination in vole pups by the photoperiod length experienced by the mother. Two hypotheses to explain PAR are the "thrifty phenotype" hypothesis and the developmental plasticity hypothesis.

== The thrifty phenotype hypothesis ==
The thrifty phenotype hypothesis is the idea that if an organism suffers from inadequate nutrition in fetal development it will subsequently be predisposed to certain genetic outcomes as an adult. A study done examining glucose tolerance of individuals born during a famine in the Netherlands in 1944-1945 favors the “thrifty phenotype” hypothesis. The results of the experiment showed that exposure to famine, particularly in late gestation, led to a decrease in the glucose tolerance of the adults. Other studies on humans have shown cardiovascular and diabetes mortality has been shown to correspond to the nutrition uptake of the parents and grandparents of an offspring during their years before puberty, hypertension in both sexes is the highest in individuals that had been small babies with large placentas, and larger female babies have decreased ovarian suppression compared to smaller babies after intermediate levels of activity in adulthood. All these studies support the thrifty phenotype hypothesis because the prenatal environment determined the phenotype that would be expressed later in life.

== The developmental plasticity hypothesis ==
Another proposed hypothesis for the presence of PARs is the developmental plasticity hypothesis. A longitudinal study performed in Helsinki, Finland investigated whether catch-up growth of smaller children increased the risk of coronary heart disease later in life. The results of this study coincide with the developmental plasticity hypothesis because as the nutrition of the small participants improved after birth, these undernourished small individuals grew at a quicker rate and had an increased chance of coronary heart disease. Another study further confirms the longitudinal study performed in Finland by showing that low weight children develop visceral fat during the catch-up growth period which can potentially result in diabetes later in life. Infants that have a low birth weight have been shown to have a reduction in functioning cells, which would instantly have a negative effect on their adult life. Additionally, a study testing drastic changes in childhood body-mass index showed that after two years of age, thin infants who have a comparatively large body-mass index from their birth weight are associated with disorders such as diabetes. The developmental plasticity hypothesis is apparent in each of these findings because the post birth development determines the health of the individual during adulthood.

== Potential future impacts ==
Continued research into predictive adaptive responses has the potential to gain crucial insight into the reasons diseases such as diabetes are so widespread.
