= CCNL1 =

Protein-coding gene in humans

Identifiers
- Aliases: CCNL1, ANIA6A, PRO1073, ania-6a, BM-001, cyclin L1
- External IDs: OMIM: 613384; MGI: 1922664; GeneCards: CCNL1

Gene location (Human)
Chr.	Chromosome 3 (human)
Band	3q25.31	Start	157,146,508 bp
Band	3q25.31	End	157,160,760 bp

Gene location (Mouse)
Chr.	Chromosome 3 (mouse)
Band	3|3 E1	Start	65,853,572 bp
Band	3|3 E1	End	65,865,670 bp
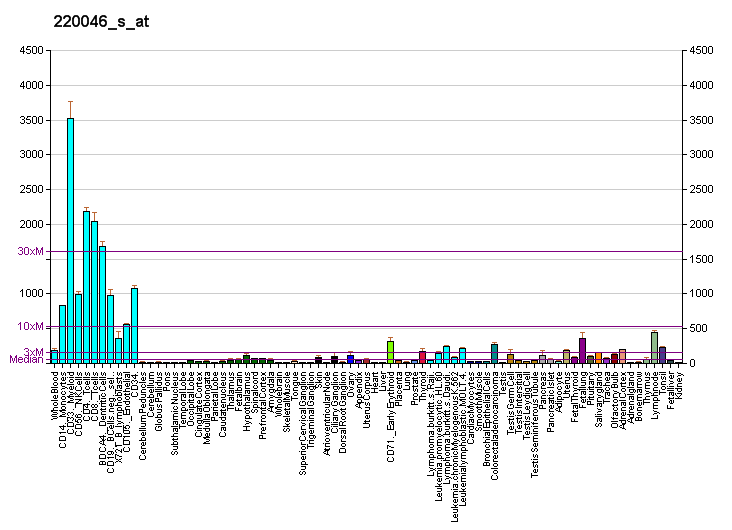
RNA expression pattern
Bgee	Human / Mouse (ortholog); Top expressed in: gastric mucosa; granulocyte; left uterine tube; monocyte; left ovary; right ovary; right lung; skin of abdomen; left lobe of thyroid gland; anterior pituitary / Top expressed in: granulocyte; saccule; Rostral migratory stream; tail of embryo; crypt of lieberkuhn of small intestine; pineal gland; otic vesicle; thymus; otic placode; genital tubercle; More reference expression data
BioGPS	More reference expression data
Gene ontology
Molecular function	cyclin-dependent protein serine/threonine kinase regulator activity; protein binding
Cellular component	nuclear speck; cyclin-dependent protein kinase holoenzyme complex; nucleoplasm; nucleus
Biological process	positive regulation of phosphorylation of RNA polymerase II C-terminal domain; RNA processing; regulation of cyclin-dependent protein serine/threonine kinase activity; regulation of transcription, DNA-templated; transcription, DNA-templated; positive regulation of transcription by RNA polymerase II; positive regulation of cyclin-dependent protein serine/threonine kinase activity; regulation of transcription by RNA polymerase II
Sources:Amigo / QuickGO
Orthologs
Databases	NCBI: entry; OMA: entry
Species	Human	Mouse
Entrez	57018	56706
Ensembl	ENSG00000163660	ENSMUSG00000027829
UniProt	Q9UK58	Q52KE7
RefSeq (mRNA)	NM_001308185; NM_020307	NM_001025442; NM_001025443; NM_019937; NM_001355432; NM_001355433
RefSeq (protein)	NP_001295114; NP_064703	NP_064321; NP_001342361; NP_001342362
Location (UCSC)	Chr 3: 157.15 – 157.16 Mb	Chr 3: 65.85 – 65.87 Mb
PubMed search
- Wikidata
View/Edit Human	View/Edit Mouse

Cyclin-L1 is a protein that in humans is encoded by the CCNL1 gene.
