= Fetal programming =

Theory about fetal development

Fetal programming, also known as prenatal programming, is the theory that environmental cues experienced during fetal development play a seminal role in determining health trajectories across the lifespan.

Three main forms of programming that occur due to changes in the maternal environment are:

- Changes in development that lead to greater disease risk;
- Genetic changes that alter disease risk;
- Epigenetic changes which alter disease risk of not only the child but also that of the next generation - i.e., after a famine, grandchildren of women who were pregnant during the famine, are born smaller than the normal size, despite nutritional deficiencies having been fulfilled.

These changes in the maternal environmental can be due to nutritional alteration, hormonal fluctuations or exposure to toxins.

== History ==
=== Dutch famine 1944–45 ===
In 1944–45, the German blockade of the Netherlands led to a lack of food supplies, causing the Dutch famine of 1944–45. The famine caused severe malnutrition among the population, including women in various stages of pregnancy. The Dutch Famine Birth Cohort Study examined the impact of lack of nutrition on children born during or after this famine. It showed that throughout their life, these children were at greater risk of diabetes, cardiovascular disease, obesity, and other non-communicable diseases.

=== Barker hypothesis ===
In the 1980s, David Barker began a research study on this topic. The Barker Hypothesis, or Thrifty phenotype, forms the basis for much of the research conducted on fetal programming. This hypothesis states that if the fetus is exposed to low nutrition, it will adapt to that environment. Nutrients are diverted towards the developing heart, brain, and other essential fetal organs. The body also undergoes metabolic alterations that ensure survival despite low nutrition but may cause problems with normal or high nutrition. This leads to increased risk of metabolic syndrome.

== Nutritional status ==
The developing fetus forms an impression of the world into which it will be born via its mother's nutritional status. Its development is thus modulated to create the best chance of survival. However, excessive or insufficient nutrition in the mother can provoke maladaptive developmental responses in the fetus, which in turn manifest in the form of post-natal diseases. This may have such a profound effect on the fetus’s adult life that it can even outweigh lifestyle factors.

=== Excessive nutrition ===
Body mass index before pregnancy and weight gain during pregnancy are linked to high blood pressure in the offspring during adulthood. Mouse models suggest that this is due to high levels of the fetal hormone leptin, which is present in the blood of individuals who are overweight or obese. There is a theory that this hormone hurts the regulatory systems of the fetus, and renders it impossible to maintain normal blood pressure levels.

=== Insufficient nutrition ===
Pre-eclampsia, involving oxygen deprivation and death of trophoblastic cells that make up most of the placenta, is a disease which is often associated with maladaptive long-term consequences of inappropriate fetal programming. Here, an inadequately developed and poorly functioning placenta fails to meet the fetus’s nutritional needs during gestation, either by altering its selection for nutrients that can cross into fetal blood or restricting total volume thereof. Consequences of this for the fetus in adult life include cardiovascular and metabolic conditions.

== Hormonal influence ==
A delicate balance of hormones during pregnancy is regarded as highly relevant to fetal programming and may significantly influence the outcome of the offspring. Placental endocrine transfer from the mother to the developing fetus could be altered by the mental state of the mother, due to affected glucocorticoid transfer that takes place across the placenta.

=== Thyroid ===
Thyroid hormones play an instrumental role during the early development of the fetus's brain. Therefore, mothers suffering from thyroid-related issues and altered thyroid hormone levels may inadvertently trigger structural and functional changes in the fetal brain. The fetus can produce its thyroid hormones from the onset of the second trimester; however, maternal thyroid hormones are important for brain development before and after the baby can synthesize the hormones while still in the uterus. Due to this, the baby may experience an increased risk of neurological or psychiatric diseases later in life.

=== Cortisol ===
Cortisol (and glucocorticoids more generally) is the most well-studied hormonal mechanism that may have prenatal programming effects. Although cortisol has normative developmental effects during prenatal development, excess cortisol exposure has deleterious effects on fetal growth, the postnatal function of physiological systems such as the hypothalamic-pituitary-adrenal axis and brain structure or connectivity (e.g., amygdala).

During gestation, cortisol concentrations in maternal circulation are up to ten times higher than cortisol concentrations in fetal circulation. The maternal-to-fetal cortisol gradient is maintained by the placenta, which forms a structural and enzymatic barrier to cortisol. During the first two trimesters of gestation intrauterine cortisol is primarily produced by the maternal adrenal glands. However, during the third trimester the fetal adrenal glands begin to endogenously produce cortisol and become responsible for most intrauterine cortisol by the time the fetus reaches term.

== Psychological stress and psychopathology ==
Mental state of the mother during pregnancy affects the fetus in the uterus, predominantly via hormones and genetics. The mother's mood, including maternal prenatal anxiety, depression and stress during pregnancy correlates with altered outcomes for the child. That being said, not every fetus exposed to these factors is affected in the same way and to the same degree, and genetic and environmental factors are believed to have a significant degree of influence.

=== Depression ===
Maternal depression poses one of the greatest risks for increased vulnerability to adverse outcomes for a baby that is developing in the uterus, especially in terms of susceptibility to a variety of psychological conditions. Mechanisms that may explain the connection between maternal depression and the offspring's future health are mostly unclear and form a current area of active research. Genetic inheritance that may be rendering the child more susceptible may play a role, including the effect on the intrauterine environment for the baby whilst the mother has depression.

=== Psychological stress ===
Maternally experienced psychological stress that occurs either before or during gestation can have intergenerational effects on offspring. Stress experienced during gestation has been linked with preterm delivery, low birth weight, and increased risk of psychopathology. The new mother may have after-effects too, such as postpartum depression, and subsequently may find parenting more difficult as compared to those who did not experience as much stress during their pregnancies.

== Toxins ==
Toxins such as alcohol, tobacco, and certain drugs to which the baby is exposed during its development are thought to contribute to fetal programming, especially via alterations to the HPA axis. If the exposure occurs during a critical phase of fetal development, it could have drastic and dire consequences for the fetus.

=== Alcohol ===
Prenatal and/or early postnatal exposure to alcohol (ethanol) has been found to hurt a child's neuroendocrine and behavioral factors. Alcohol passes through the placenta on being ingested by the mother during her pregnancy, and makes its way to the baby in utero. Changes posed to the fetus through ethanol exposure may significantly effect growth and development; these are collectively known as fetal alcohol spectrum disorders (FASD). The exact interaction between ethanol and the developing fetus is complex and largely uncertain, however, several direct and indirect effects have been observed as the fetus matures. Predominant among these are irregularities in the fetus's endocrine, metabolic, and physiological functions.

=== Smoking ===
The negative consequences of smoking are well-known, and these may be even more apparent during pregnancy. Exposure to tobacco smoke during pregnancy, commonly known as in utero maternal tobacco smoke exposure (MTSE), can contribute towards various problems in babies of smoking mothers. About 20% of mothers smoke whilst pregnant and this is associated with increased risk of complications, such as preterm birth, decreased fetal growth leading to lower birth weight, and impaired fetal lung development.

=== Drugs ===
There is evidence pointing towards pharmacological programming of the fetus during the first trimester. One type of drugs which is suspected of influencing the developing baby when used during pregnancy is anti-hypertensive drugs. Pre-eclampsia (a condition of hypertension during pregnancy) is a serious problem for the majority of pregnant mothers and can predispose the mother to a variety of complications, including increased risk of mortality and problems during parturition.
