= Dutch famine of 1944–1945 =

Widespread Famine in the Nazi-occupied Netherlands caused by the occupation

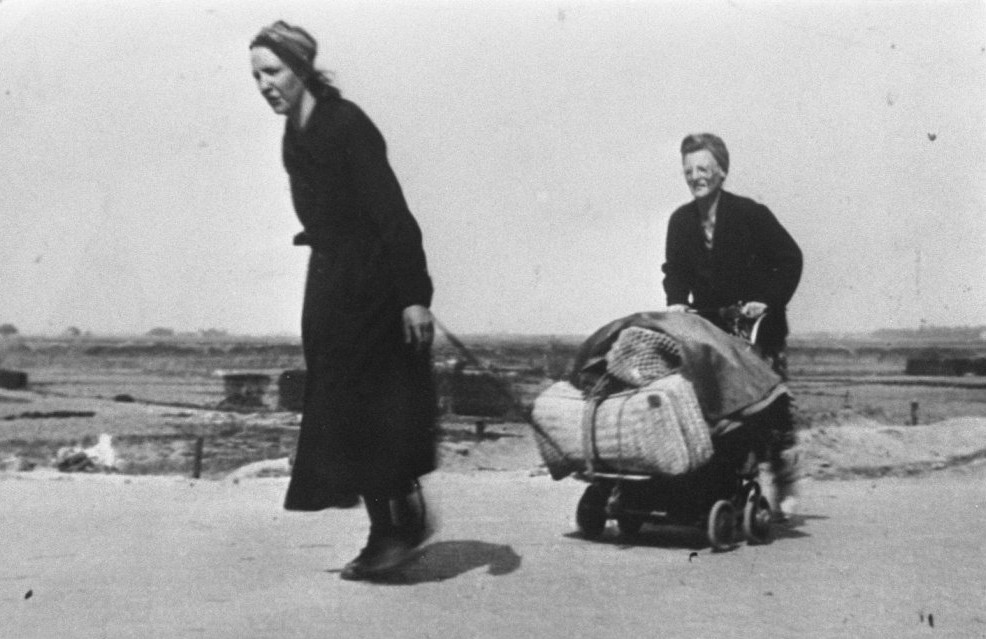
- Women "food trekkers" transporting food from the countryside to the cities during the famine period.
- Country: Netherlands
- Location: German-occupied Netherlands
- Period: 1944–1945
- Total deaths: 22,000
- Causes: Embargo and blockade on food

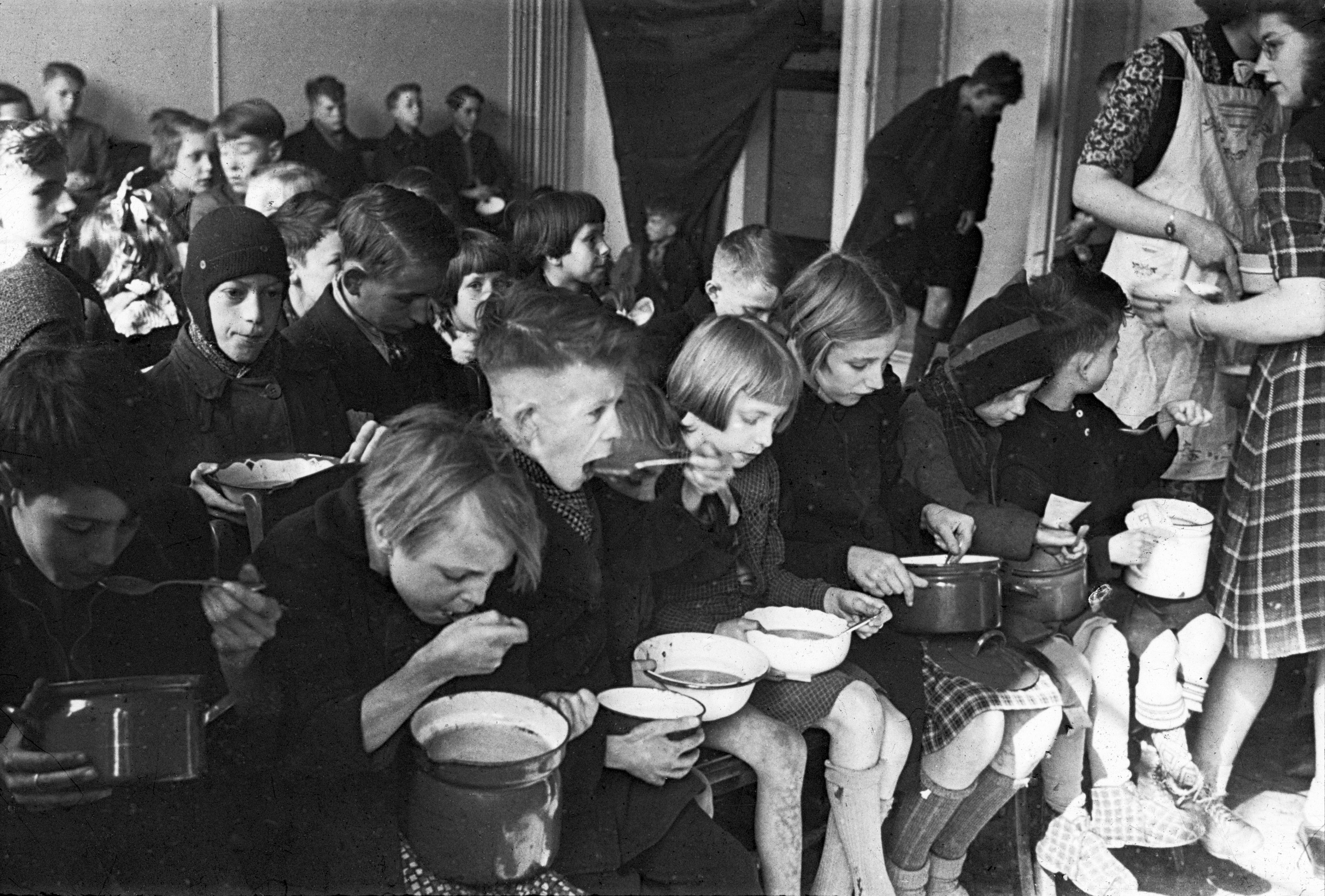
Dutch children eating soup during the famine of 1944–1945.

The Dutch famine of 1944–1945, also known as the Hunger Winter (from Dutch Hongerwinter), was a famine in the German-occupied Netherlands during World War II. The famine impacted the people in the densely populated and urbanized western provinces north of the great rivers during and after the harsh winter of 1944–1945. It began after the failure of Operation Market Garden, the Allied military offensive against the German occupiers of the Netherlands in September 1944. It persisted until after the German surrender in May 1945.

A German embargo and a Dutch railway strike resulted in food and fuel shipments from rural areas to the cities being halted or much diminished. The Dutch government rationed food, but the ration decreased to starvation levels in late 1944 and early 1945. Government-run soup kitchens, community organizations, and individual "food trekkers" who journeyed from the cities to the countryside to buy or barter for food relieved some of the hardships. Some 4.3 million people in the urbanized western region of the country were impacted. About 20,000 deaths are attributed to the famine. Most of the victims were elderly, especially men. The worst month for deaths was March 1945.

German intransigence and the Allied reluctance to send aid into the German-controlled Netherlands slowed the provision of foreign aid. Swedish, Swiss, and Red Cross food began to arrive in February 1945 and from 29 April to 8 May 1945 British and American air forces, with concurrence from the German occupiers, dropped food into the country. From 2 to 9 May in a Canadian army operation, food was brought into the Netherlands by truck. After the surrender of Germany on May 8, large quantities of aid by the allies alleviated the famine.

The impact of the famine on survivors has been extensively studied by Dutch and foreign medical scholars.

== Causes ==
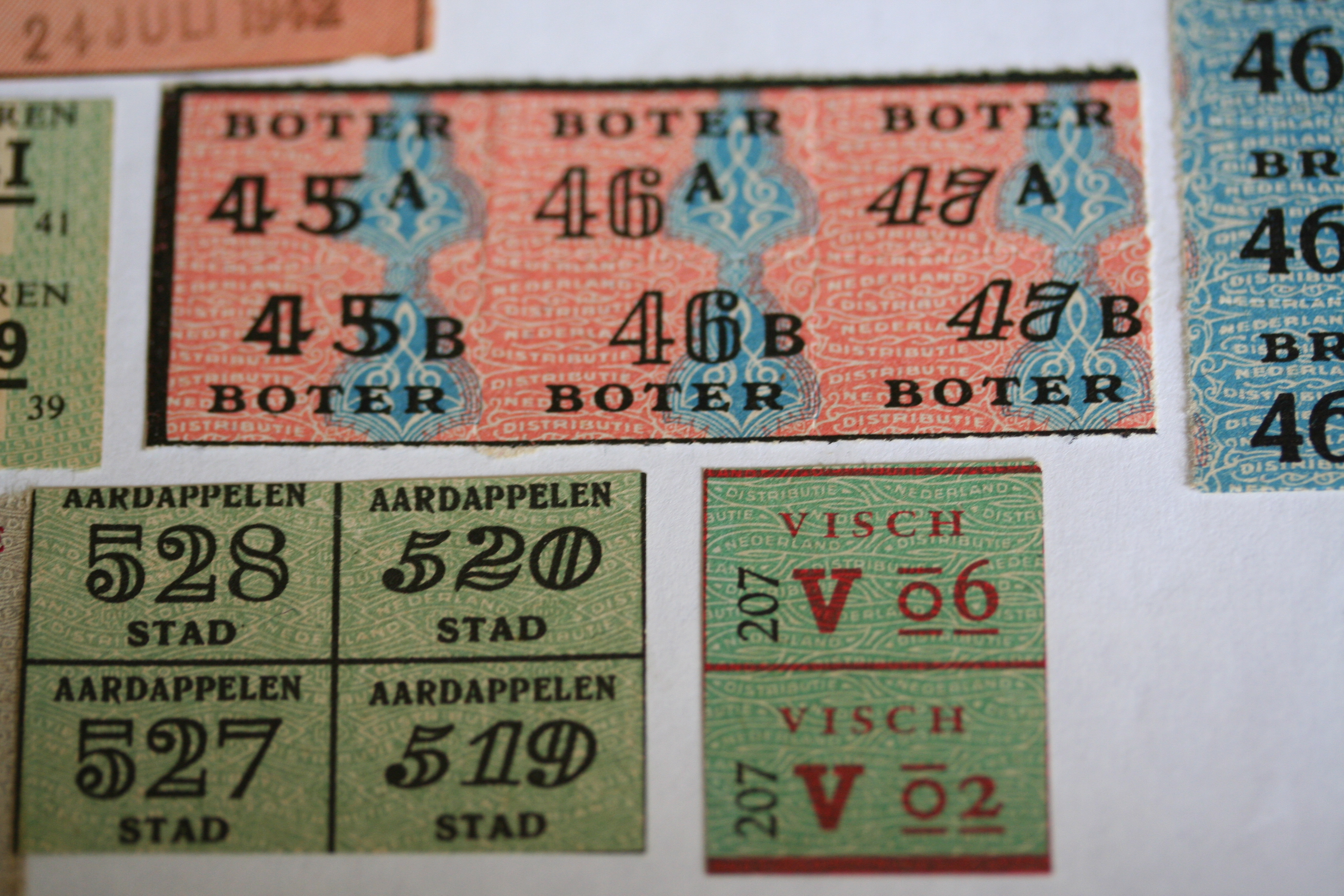
Dutch food ration coupons from World War II

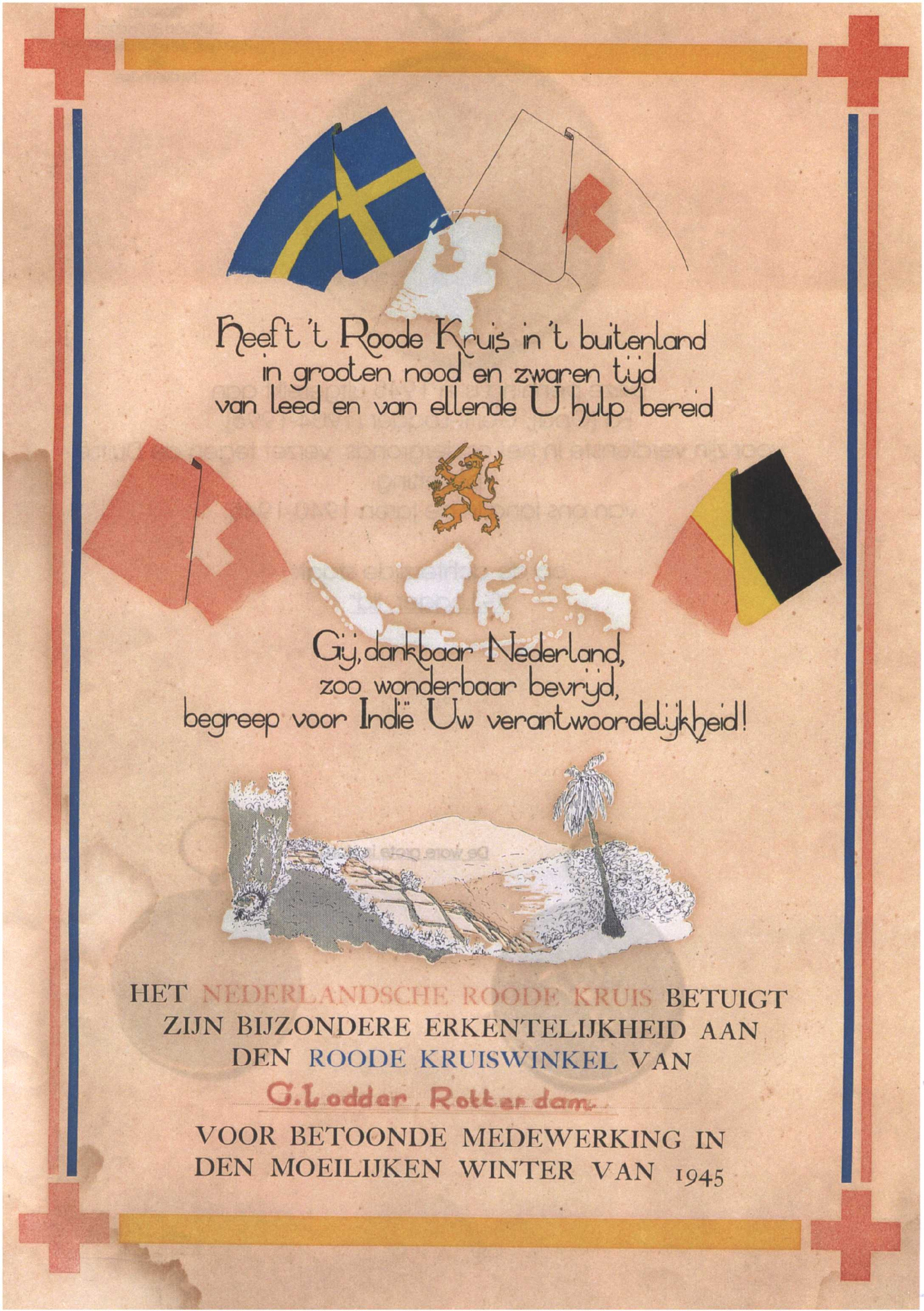
A letter of commemoration given to a grocer whose shop served as a Red Cross point giving out the "Swedish bread"

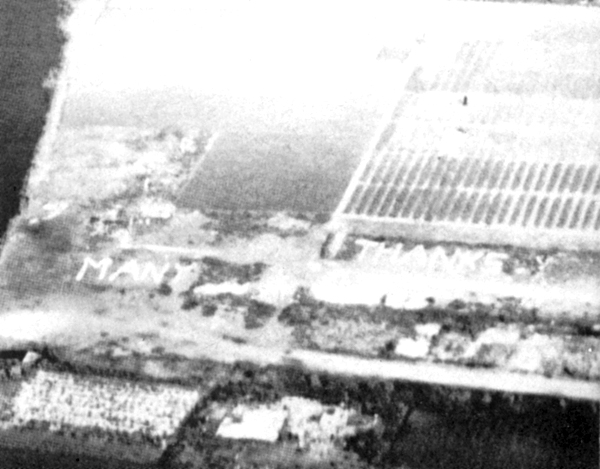
Operation Manna – "Many Thanks" written in tulips, Holland, May 1945.

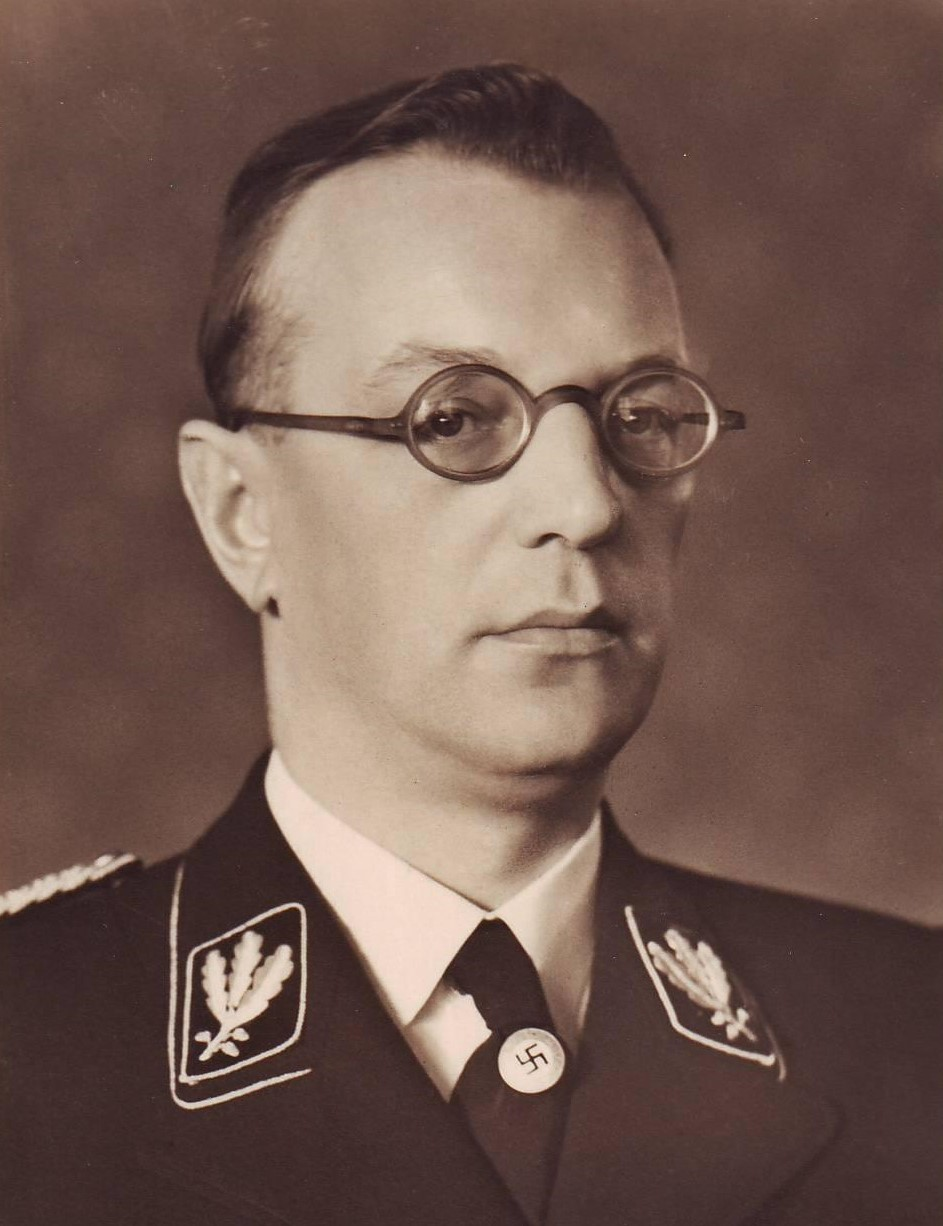
Reichskommissar Arthur Seyss-Inquart struck back against the Dutch rail strike on September 27 with a blockade of all food transport by ship from the agricultural northeast to the western provinces. He would later be executed at Nuremberg.

Prior to late 1944, the people of the Netherlands suffered few shortages of food as a consequence of the occupation of their country by Nazi Germany. Food available per person per day amounted to about 3,000 calories. After the Normandy landings in France on 6 June 1944, the Allied forces overran most of France and Belgium. Allied forces first entered the Netherlands at Mesch on 12 September Some Allied generals anticipated that Germany would be defeated before the end of 1944. Operation Market Garden was launched on 17 September with that thought in mind.

The Allied advance toward Germany and the liberation of the Netherlands was delayed by supply problems as the strategic port of Antwerp, Belgium was not usable until the approaches had been secured and cleared in the Battle of the Scheldt in the Netherlands. The port was not fully operational until mid-December 1944. British commander Montgomery had prioritized "Market Garden" and the capture of the French Channel ports like Boulogne, Calais, and Dunkirk, which were resolutely defended and had suffered demolitions by the retreating Germans. These factors led to the Germans becoming more securely entrenched north of the major rivers in the Netherlands and postponing the liberation until the end of World War II.

Market Garden was one of two precursor events leading to the hunger winter. The objective of Market Garden was for Allied forces to cross and gain control of bridges across several large rivers in the Netherlands thus removing obstacles to the invasion of the industrial Ruhr region of Germany. If successful, Market Garden would have liberated most or all of the Netherlands. The operation failed to achieve its main objective, control of the lower Rhine, but did capture about one-fourth of the Netherlands. The Germans retained control of the north and west and most of the population of the country. The regions captured by the Allies contained food-producing areas and the country's only coal mines. Simultaneously, on 17 September, the Netherlands government-in-exile in the United Kingdom declared a national railway strike to support the Allied liberation effort. Anticipating that the Germans would soon be expelled from the Netherlands, the national railways complied. Thirty thousand railway workers stayed home and most transportation of food and other commodities in the Netherlands came to a halt. The strike coincided with the beginning of the potato harvest and the transport of potatoes from farms to the cities also halted.

On 24 September the German administration's Reichskommissar Arthur Seyss-Inquart issued a public warning that sabotage of railways, telephone lines, or post offices would be severely and collectively punished. On 25 September, the failure of Operation Market Garden had left the Germans in full control of northern and western Netherlands. On 27 September, the Nazi military command led by Wehrmachtbefehlshaber Friedrich Christiansen announced German retaliation on the Dutch by placing an embargo on all food transport from the eastern to the western Netherlands. Western Netherlands is where the large cities of the country are located. The embargo was lifted for potatoes on 16 October, and fully lifted to permit the transport of all food on 8 November. The Germans feared that food shortages might cause chaos and resistance if the embargo on food transportation continued. However, the Dutch railways did not resume service until the end of the war in May 1945.

The Germans had confiscated sizeable quantities of Dutch farmland for military uses and flooded even more for defense against an Allied invasion by sea. Thus, agriculture production and food stocks were reduced throughout the Netherlands during the war. The Germans impressed at least 120,000 Dutch men for labor projects from September to December 1944 reducing the agricultural and transport workforce. The Germans also contributed to the famine by shipping 78,000 tons of potatoes from the Netherlands to Germany between October 1944 and February 1945.

Shortages of fuel resulted in the Dutch government disconnecting electricity and gas service to households, the black market for food expanded as farmers and speculators withheld food from the government's food rationing system. Colder than average weather in January and February 1945 put more stress on people, now without electricity in their homes, and the transportation system. This stress was particularly evident in the large cities of the western Netherlands. The population in this region numbered 4.3 million (almost one-half of the population of the whole country) of which 2.6 million lived in cities. There, the famine struck hardest. American and British bombing raids on German troops and bases in the Netherlands disrupted the transport of food and killed many Dutch civilians.

Author Banning summed up conditions in the Netherlands in the winter of 1944–1945:

the population sat without light, without gas, without heat; laundries ceased operating; soap for personal use was unobtainable; shoes, textiles, and adequate clothing were lacking...Hunger dominated all this misery

=== The liberated south ===
Conditions in the three provinces in southern Netherlands deteriorated rather than improved after their liberation in September 1944 by the Allied armies. From 1,600 calories daily as the adult ration before the failure of Market Garden, the ration in mid-November 1944 had decreased to 1,000 calories daily. Moreover the Dutch and Dutch leaders were incensed that captured German soldiers received the same ration as that of Allied soldiers, more than 3,000 calories per day. Allied food aid relieved the hunger problem in late November.

== Dutch response ==
In the words of a historian, "Never in its history did Holland have to consider the downfall of its people and the destruction of its civilization as seriously as it had during the final months before May 1945." The Dutch government in the three-fourths of the country occupied by Germany, faced the arithmetic of starvation. The average adult male needs to eat 2,500 calories of food per day and the average adult female needs 2,000 calories per day. An average of 1,200 calories consumed per day over an extended period is often regarded as the minimum needed to maintain normal bodily functions.

At the beginning of World War II, the Dutch government had anticipated that the war would result in shortages of food and had created a nation-wide food rationing system and stockpiled food. The stockpiled food stocks became dangerously low as the war rolled on into 1944. Additional food was available in the more rural and agricultural provinces of northern Netherlands, but it was difficult to move the food from those areas to the affected cities in western Netherlands. Likewise, food from the southern Netherlands, under Allied control after Market Garden, was unavailable to the western cities. One measure implemented to reduce famine in the cities was the evacuation of about 40,000 children from the cities to the countryside where more food was available.

The Dutch government's rationing system distributed basic foods to all citizens. In September 1944, rationed food in the 4.3 million people living in the urbanized western Netherlands provided about 1,400 calories per day to every resident. Supplemental rations were given to manual laborers, young children, and pregnant women. With Market Garden and its aftermath, food stocks rapidly decreased and by 26 November 1944, the rationing system provided only 750 calories per day to each person. The ration stayed in the range of 500 to 900 calories daily from then until 25 April 1945 when it reached a low of 400 calories per day. It rebounded from that low to more than 2,000 calories per person per day on 27 May. The quick recovery was due to the surrender of German military forces in the Netherlands on 5 May 1945 and food assistance from Sweden, Switzerland, the United States, Britain, and Canada.

In addition to the rationing system, the government provided food through soup kitchens in the cities. As the intensity of the famine increased, the reliance on soup kitchens increased. In April 1945, 1.8 million people in the cities were served daily. One pint of soup per person was the normal ration. The quality of the soup deteriorated over time and some people considered it inedible. The caloric content of a soup ration diminished from 483 calories to 268 calories. The soup served was often made from sugar beets, tulip bulbs, and potato peels. Pet dogs and cats were sometimes eaten.

Church and community based activities to fight the famine were also important. Membership in a church, a non-government organization (NGO), or a community sometimes resulted in better access to food – at the expense of others who had no such links. In 1945, women's protests demanding more food for their children were frequent. The Germans on at least one occasion ordered the Dutch authorities to shoot protesting women, but the Dutch police did not comply.

Prior to Operation Market Garden, an estimated 20 percent of Dutch food production reached the consumer through the illegal, but tolerated black market. After Market Garden, that percentage reached about 40 percent. Many thousands of city residents, including future actress Audrey Hepburn, undertook "food treks" to the countryside to trade with farmers. Black market prices rose to incredible levels. For example, the black market price for potatoes rose by 7,000 percent above the official price during the war, although most transactions with farmers were probably barter rather than cash. Many stories also tell of farmers dealing fairly with the trekkers.

In search of food, thousands of city dwellers walked—pushing rickety carts, prams, and bicycles—across the cold, bare countryside, searching for a few potatoes or a cauliflower. If they were lucky enough to find something, they would exchange it for jewelry, antiques, watches, linen, and in some cases sexual favours. Towards spring, as the desperation increased, these hunger tours would sometimes last for weeks, taking some walkers as far as Friesland in the east of the Netherlands.

The food situation in the Netherlands never resulted in the anarchy associated with many famines. The government continued to function and collect and distribute food, communities did not fall into chaos, and the black market supplemented official and community efforts to feed the populace.

By 1945, funeral homes could no longer cope with the increasing numbers of the deceased. Frost and the lack of wood for coffins made burials difficult or impossible. The government established the Municipal Bureau for Burial in January 1945 to help with the crisis. In Amsterdam, the Zuiderkerk was used as an emergency mortuary.

== Humanitarian intervention ==
On 12 December 1944, Dutch food official Hans Max Hirschfeld met with German Reichskommissar Arthur Seyss-Inquart and work began to find a modus vivendi that would permit famine aid by the Dutch to their citizens to proceed without hindrance by the Germans. Seyss-Inquart feared that worsening of the famine would increase Dutch resistance to the German occupation. After the war ended, he cited "his efforts to protect the Dutch from disaster" as a defense of his rule of the Netherlands. He was convicted and hanged by the Allies for other crimes. On their part, September 1944 to mid-April 1945 "saw Allied political and military priorities almost always override Dutch humanitarian concerns."

British Prime Minister Winston Churchill initially opposed providing any food aid to German-occupied countries, knowing it could end up feeding German soldiers. Supreme Allied Commander Dwight D. Eisenhower was more responsive to the Dutch whose appeal for food stated that "the Netherlands government cannot accept the liberation of corpses." With the occupying Germans in concurrence, the first foreign aid to reach the Netherlands was carried on two Swedish ships which docked in Holland in February 1945. Food distribution began on 26 February. The Swedish ships carried more than 3,700 tons of food, of which the majority was flour used to make "Swedish bread". Additional shipments of food arrived from Sweden, Switzerland, and the International Red Cross (ICRC) for a total of 14,000 tons between February and April—less than the 5,000 tons of food aid needed per week to end the famine, now verging on catastrophic in the Dutch cities and spreading to the adjacent countryside.

In April 1945, Seyss-Inquart said he was willing to negotiate a truce in western Netherlands to permit entry of food into German-occupied Netherlands. The result of the negotiations was an agreement to permit the Allied air forces to drop food into the Netherlands. The British and American air supply missions were called respectively Operations Manna and Chowhound. Between 29 April and 8 May they dropped 7.8 million kilograms of food into the Netherlands. Additional pre-surrender relief came via truck during Operation Faust, a Canadian operation which took place from 2-9 May. The effort, the result of negotiations between Lieutenant General Charles Foulkes of the Canadian Army and the Wehrmacht's Generalleutnant Paul Reichelt, allowed Canadian trucks to pass through German lines, delivering hundreds of tons of food daily, along with medical supplies and coal. These operations coincided with the surrender of Germany. All German military forces in the Netherlands surrendered on 4 May. Allied military forces bringing food rushed into the formerly occupied parts of the Netherlands. Emergency food aid was given to 190,000 people. By mid-July the supply of food was adequate.

== Consequences of the famine ==
Author Zwarte says that the excess deaths in the western provinces of the Netherlands totalled 35,000 from September 1944 to July 1945 and that the number of deaths attributable to the famine was around 20,000. The greatest number of deaths was in March 1945. About 60 percent of the famine deaths were male. About 60 percent of deaths were people 65 years of age or older.

The Dutch famine of 1944–45 was a rare case of a famine which took place in a modern, developed, and literate country, albeit one suffering under the privations of occupation and war. The well-documented experience has helped scientists to measure the effects of famine on human health.

The Dutch Famine Birth Cohort Study found that the children of pregnant women exposed to famine were more susceptible to diabetes, obesity, cardiovascular disease, microalbuminuria and other health problems.

Grandchildren of pregnant women carrying female babies during the famine were also shown to be smaller at birth and suffer increased health issues later in life. This suggests damage or epigenetic changes to the ova developing inside the female fetus in utero, a phenomenon known as intergenerational inheritance.

The discovery of the cause of coeliac disease may also be partly attributed to the Dutch famine. With wheat in very short supply there was an improvement at a children's ward of coeliac patients. Stories tell of the first precious supplies of bread being given specifically to the (no longer) sick children, prompting an immediate relapse. Thus in the 1940s the Dutch paediatrician Dr. Willem Dicke was able to corroborate his previously researched hypothesis that wheat intake was aggravating coeliac disease. Dicke later went on to prove his hypothesis.

Audrey Hepburn spent her childhood in the Netherlands (officially residing in Arnhem, then in Velp) during the famine and despite her later wealth she had lifelong negative medical repercussions. She had anemia, respiratory illnesses, and œdema as a result.

Subsequent academic research on the children who were affected in the second trimester of their mother's pregnancy found an increased incidence of schizophrenia in these children. Also increased among them were the rates of schizotypal personality and neurological defects.

== See also ==
- Bengal famine of 1943
- Chinese famine of 1942–1943
- Effect of the Siege of Leningrad on the city
- Great Famine in German-occupied Greece
- Historical trauma
- Holodomor in Ukraine
- Hunger Plan
- List of famines
- Överkalix study
- Prenatal nutrition and birth weight
- Siege of Leningrad
- Transgenerational epigenetics
- Vietnamese famine of 1944–1945
