= David Barker (epidemiologist) =

English physician and epidemiologist

David James Purslove Barker
- Born: 29 June 1938; London
- Died: 27 August 2013 (aged 75)
- Known for: Barker Hypothesis
- Scientific career
- Fields: Epidemiology
- Institutions: University of Southampton

David James Purslove Barker (29 June 1938 – 27 August 2013) was an English physician and epidemiologist and originator of the Barker Hypothesis that foetal and early infant conditions have a permanent conditioning effect on the body's metabolism and chronic conditions later in life.

He was born in London the son of Hugh Barker, an engineer, and Joye, a concert cellist. At Oundle School, he developed an interest in Natural History and was given special access to the biology classrooms to study his finds. The Natural History Museum later asked him to mount an expedition to collect plant specimens from the Icelandic offshore island of Grimsey.

He studied medicine at Guy's Hospital, London, but maintained his interest in Natural History, and had his first paper published in Nature in 1961. After qualifying in 1962, he became a research fellow in the department of social medicine at Birmingham University. In 1969, with a grant from the Medical Research Council, Barker moved with his family to Uganda, to research Mycobacterium ulcerans infection ("Buruli ulcer"), demonstrating that it was caused, not by mosquitos, but by wounds caused by the razor-sharp reeds growing near the River Nile.

He returned to England and in 1979 was appointed professor of clinical epidemiology at the University of Southampton medical school, and in 1984 director of the Medical Research Council Environmental Epidemiology Unit, now the MRC Lifecourse Epidemiology Unit. There he made the observations on the geographical relationship between neonatal and post-neonatal mortality and heart disease. He won the GlaxoSmithKline Prize in 1994 for this work.

Barker was elected as a Fellow of the Royal Society and a Fellow of the Academy of Medical Sciences in 1998 and was appointed a CBE in 2006.

He married twice; firstly to Angela, with whom he had three sons and two daughters, and secondly to Jan.
