= Thrifty phenotype =

Theory of prenatal development

Thrifty phenotype refers to the correlation between low birth weight of neonates and the increased risk of developing metabolic syndromes later in life, including type 2 diabetes and cardiovascular diseases. Although early life undernutrition is thought to be the key driving factor to the hypothesis, other environmental factors have been explored for their role in susceptibility, such as physical inactivity. Genes may also play a role in susceptibility of these diseases, as they may make individuals predisposed to factors that lead to increased disease risk.

== Historical overview ==
The term thrifty phenotype was first coined by Charles Nicholas Hales and David Barker in a study published in 1992. In their study, the authors reviewed the literature up to and addressed five central questions regarding role of different factors in type 2 diabetes on which they based their hypothesis. These questions included the following:

1. The role of beta cell deficiency in type 2 diabetes.
2. The extent to which beta cell deficiency contributes to insulin intolerance.
3. The role of major nutritional elements in fetal growth.
4. The role of abnormal amino acid supply in growth limited neonates.
5. The role of malnutrition in irreversibly defective beta cell growth.

From the review of the existing literature, they posited that poor nutritional status in fetal and early neonatal stages could hamper the development and proper functioning of the pancreatic beta cells by impacting structural features of islet anatomy, which could consequently make the individual more susceptible to the development of type 2 diabetes in later life. However, they did not exclude other causal factors such as obesity, ageing and physical inactivity as determining factors of type 2 diabetes.

In a later study, Barker et al. analyzed living patient data from Hertfordshire, UK, and found that men in their sixties having low birthweight (2.95 kg or less) were 10 times more likely to develop syndrome X (type 2 diabetes, hypertension and hyperlipidemia) than men of the same age whose birthweight was 4.31 kg or more. This statistical correlation was independent of the gestation period and other possible confounding factors such as current social class or social class at birth, smoking, and consumption of alcohol. Furthermore, they argued that they were likely to underestimate this association, since they could only sample the surviving patients, and patients having more severe manifestations of syndrome X were less likely to survive to that age.

In 1994, Phillips' et al. found statistically significant association between thinness in birth (measured as Ponderal index) and insulin resistance, the association being independent of length of gestation period, adult body mass index, and confounding factors like then-current social class or social class at birth.

In 2001, Hales and Barker updated the hypothesis by positing that the thrifty phenotype may be an evolutionary adaptation: the thrifty phenotype responds to fetal malnutrition by selectively preserving more vital organs of the body and preparing the fetus for a postnatal environment where resources will be scarce.

== Evolutionary rationale ==
=== Offspring ===
Maternal nutrition can affect the development of the unborn child in poor nutritional environments such that it will be prepared for survival within that poor environment. This results in a thrifty phenotype (Hales & Barker, 1992). It is sometimes called Barker's hypothesis, after Professor David J. P. Barker, researching at the University of Southampton who published the theory in 1990.

=== Metabolic ===
The thrifty phenotype hypothesis says that early-life metabolic adaptations help in survival of the organism by selecting an appropriate trajectory of growth in response to environmental cues. An example of this is type 2 diabetes. In their review, Barker and Hales discuss evidence that beta cells abnormally develop due to malnutrition during fetal development, causing insulin abnormalities later in life. The review also notes that low birth weight alone does not necessarily mean that it is a manifestation of thrifty phenotype. Since low birth weight is not exclusively caused by maternal malnutrition, meaning that other factors could influence the low birth weight–disease relationship.

Before the term thrifty phenotype was coined, Barker had noted the phenomenon with cardiovascular disease. In his lecture paper, he discusses the role of malnutrition during fetal development in obstructed lung disease (now known as chronic obstructive pulmonary disease [COPD]), ischemic heart disease, and blood pressure. In each of these diseases, there was an association with social class and development prevalence of the disease. This was determined to be due to issues of malnutrition during key points in organ development in utero.

=== Benefit for mother ===
However, environmental changes during early development may result in the selected trajectory becoming inappropriate, resulting in adverse effects on health. This paradox generates doubts about whether the thrifty phenotype is adaptive for human offspring. Thus, the thrifty phenotype should be considered as the capacity of all offspring to respond to environmental cues during early ontogenetic development. It has been suggested that the thrifty phenotype is the consequence of three unlike adaptive processes: maternal effects, niche construction and developmental plasticity, which all are influenced by the brain. While developmental plasticity demonstrates an adaptation by the offspring, niche construction and parental effects are result of parental selections rather than offspring fitness. Therefore, the thrifty phenotype can be described as a manipulation of offspring phenotype for the benefit of maternal fitness. The information that enters offspring phenotype during early development mirror the mother's own developmental experience and the quality of the environment during her own maturation rather than predicting the possible future environment of the offspring

=== Other consequences ===
Not all research into this topic has been conducted on diseases. Other research has explored the thrifty phenotype hypothesis as a causal factor for differing development into puberty and adulthood. A review on the literature, up to 2013, discussed not only the hierarchical tissue preservation within pancreatic cells, but research on limb shortening to preserve development of more vital organs and bones. An example of this phenomenon is a study published in 2018 by the Royal Society, which found that hypoxic stress from differing altitudes affected offspring limb length. Fetal overnutrition may also play a key role in development, increasing the likelihood of early puberty and obesity.

== Adverse effects ==
Many human diseases in adulthood are related to growth patterns during early life, determining early-life nutrition as the underlying mechanism. Individuals with a thrifty phenotype will have "a smaller body size, a lowered metabolic rate and a reduced level of behavioral activity... adaptations to an environment that is chronically short of food" (Bateson & Martin, 1999). Those with a thrifty phenotype who actually develop in an affluent environment may be more prone to metabolic disorders, such as obesity and type II diabetes, whereas those who have received a positive maternal forecast will be adapted to good conditions and therefore better able to cope with rich diets. This idea (Barker, 1992) is now widely (if not universally) accepted and is a source of concern for societies undergoing a transition from sparse to better nutrition (Robinson, 2001).

Risk factors of thrifty phenotype include advanced maternal age and placental insufficiency.

== Molecular mechanisms ==
The ability to conserve, acquire and expend energy is believed to be an innate, ancient trait that is embedded in the genome in a way that is quite protected against mutations. These changes are also believed to possibly be inherited across generations. Leptin has been identified as a possible gene for the acquisition of these thrifty traits.

On a larger anatomic scale, the molecular mechanisms are broadly caused by a suboptimal environment in the reproductive tract or maternal physiological adaptations to pregnancy.

== See also ==
- Evolutionary developmental psychology
- Evolutionary physiology
- Phenotypic plasticity
- Trivers–Willard hypothesis
- Thrifty gene hypothesis
- Prenatal nutrition and birth weight
