= Rubin maneuver =

Secondary, rotational maneuver to deliver the baby in case of shoulder dystocia

Rubin's I and II maneuvers, rotational maneuver to deliver the baby in case of shoulder dystocia.

The Rubin's I maneuver is dislodging the anterior shoulder under pubic symphysis by adding suprapubic pressure while in the McRoberts' position. As a result, the bisacromial diameter is rotated from anteroposterior to oblique lie.

The Rubin's II maneuver, usually performed after all other exterior maneuvers are exhausted (including McRoberts' and Gaskin's) is performed by inserting one hand vaginally behind the posterior aspect of anterior shoulder of the baby and rotating the shoulder towards the chest of the baby, shifting it from the anterior-posterior pelvic diameter into the oblique pelvic diameter and dislodging it from behind the symphysis pubis. If ineffective, this may progress to the Wood's screw, Reverse Wood's screw, or sweeping the foetal arm.

Rubin II procedure

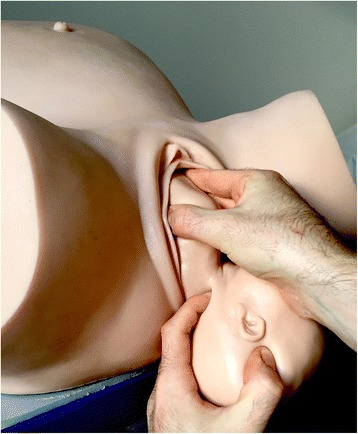
Step 1: Index and middle fingers insertion with the hand opposite the baby's face

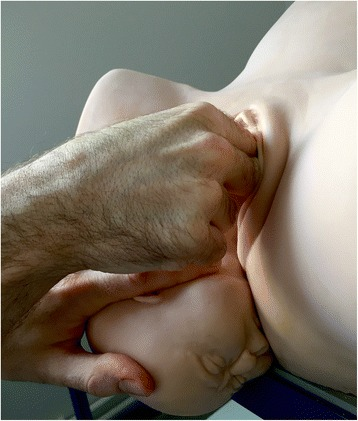
Step 2: Baby's head slightly tilted downward with the free hand

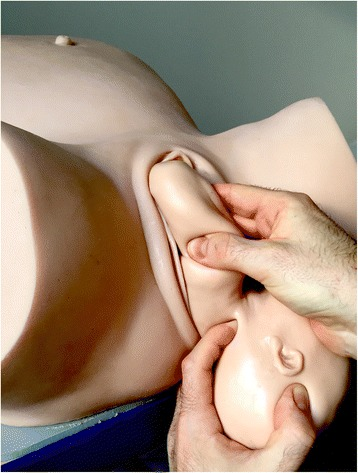
Step 3: Two fingers are placed on the humerus like a splint

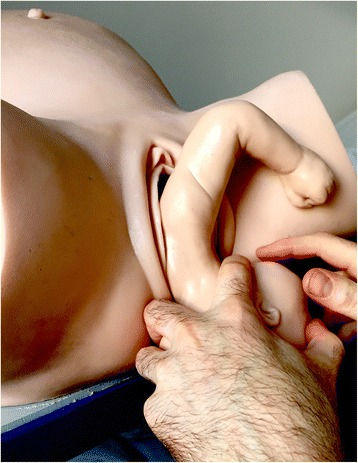
Step 4: Baby's hand appears under the maternal pubic symphysis, allowing the anterior arm to be delivered
