= Fundal height =

Measure of fetal growth

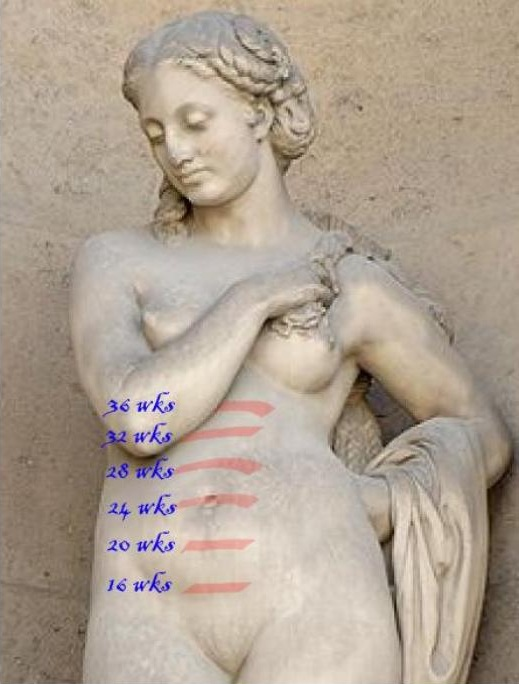
Illustration of fundal height at various points during pregnancy

Fundal height, or McDonald's rule, is a measurement of the size of the uterus used to assess fetal growth and development during pregnancy. It is measured from the top of the mother's uterus to the top of the mother's pubic symphysis. Fundal height, when expressed in centimeters, roughly corresponds to gestational age in weeks between 16 and 36 weeks for a vertex fetus. When a tape measure is unavailable, finger widths are used to estimate centimeter (week) distances from a corresponding anatomical landmark. However, landmark distances from the pubic symphysis are highly variable depending on body type. In clinical practice, recording the actual fundal height measurement from the palpable top of the uterus to the superior edge of the pubic symphysis is standard practice beginning around 20 weeks gestation.

Most caregivers will record their patient's fundal height on every prenatal visit. Measuring the fundal height can be an indicator of proper fetal growth and amniotic fluid development.

Knowledge of gestational age may impact how the height is measured.

== Fundal height landmarks ==
Gestational age	Fundal height landmark
12–14 weeks	Pubic symphysis
16 weeks	Between Umbilicus and pubic symphysis
20–22 weeks	Umbilicus
36 weeks	Xiphoid process of sternum
37–40 weeks	Regression of fundal height between 36 and 32 cm

== Shorter measure ==
A shorter measure can happen for one of the following reasons:

- Fetus descent into the pelvis, seen normally two to four weeks before delivery
- Error in estimated date of pregnancy based on first day of last menstrual period
- Fetus is healthy but physically small
- Oligohydramnios
- Non longitudinal lie
- Small for gestational age or Intrauterine Growth Restriction

== Longer measure ==
On the other side, a longer measure can be caused by:

- Twins, or other types of multiple births
- Error in estimated date of conception
- Fetus is healthy but physically large
- Gestational diabetes causing a larger baby
- Polyhydramnios
- Large for gestational age
- Hydatidiform Mole
- Breech birth

As a pregnancy approaches its end, the fundal height will become less accurate. Symphysiofundal height is more accurate at 14–32 weeks.
