= Underweight =

Below a weight considered healthy

- The underweight range according to the body mass index (BMI) is the white area on the chart.
- Specialty: Endocrinology

Underweight is a term describing a person whose body weight is considered too low to be healthy. The definition usually refers to people with a body mass index (BMI) of under 18.5 or a weight 15% to 20% below that normal for their age and height group. While obesity is a major public health concern in many developed nations, being underweight can also carry significant health risks and is a primary cause of mortality in developing countries.

== Assessment ==
| Category | BMI (kg⋅m^{−2}) |
|---|---|
| Underweight (severe) | < 16.0 |
| Underweight (moderate) | 16.0 – 16.9 |
| Underweight (mild) | 17.0 – 18.4 |
| Normal weight | 18.5 – 24.9 |
| Overweight | 25.0 – 29.9 |
| Obese | ≥ 30.0 |

The body mass index, a ratio of a person's weight to their height, has traditionally been used to assess the health of a person as it pertains to weight: under the cut-off point at a BMI of 18.5, a person is considered underweight. The calculation is given by the mass per height squared, with results usually given in kg/m^{2} (for an approximate conversion from lb/in^{2}, divide by 703). Another measure of underweight is through comparison to the average weight of a cohort of people of a similar age and height: people who are at least 15% to 20% below the average weight for the group are considered underweight.

Body fat percentage has been suggested as another way to assess whether a person is underweight. Unlike the body mass index, which is a proxy measurement, the body fat percentage takes into account the difference in composition between adipose tissue (fat cells) and muscle tissue and their different roles in the body. The American Council on Exercise defines the amount of essential fat, below which a person is underweight, as 10–13% for women and 2–5% for men. The greater amount of essential body fat in women supports reproductive function.

== Prevalence ==
Using the body mass index as a measure of weight-related health, with data from 2014, age-standardised global prevalence of underweight in women and men were 9.7% and 8.8%, respectively. These values were lower than what was reported for 1975 as 14.6% and 13.8%, respectively, indicating a worldwide reduction in the extent of undernutrition.

== Causes ==
A person may be underweight due to genetics, poor absorption of nutrients, increased metabolic rate or energy expenditure, lack of food (frequently due to poverty), low appetite, drugs that affect appetite, illness (physical or mental) or the eating disorder anorexia nervosa.

Being underweight is associated with certain medical conditions, including type 1 diabetes, hyperthyroidism, cancer, and tuberculosis. People with gastrointestinal or liver problems may be unable to absorb nutrients adequately. People with certain eating disorders can also be underweight due to one or more nutrient deficiencies or excessive exercise, which exacerbates nutrient deficiencies.

A common belief is that healthy underweight individuals can 'eat what they want' and then burn it off either by high levels of activity or elevated metabolism. It has been shown, however, that individuals with BMI < 18.5 eat about 12% less calories than individuals with normal BMI (21.5 to 25) and they are 23% less physically active (by accelerometry). Underweight people tend to have low appetites and typically eat little, sporadically or infrequently.

== Problems ==
Being underweight can be a symptom of an underlying condition, in which case it is secondary. Unexplained weight loss may require a professional medical diagnosis by a physician.

Being underweight can also cause other conditions, in which case it is primary. Severely underweight individuals may have poor physical stamina and a weak immune system, leaving them open to infection. According to Robert E. Black of the Johns Hopkins School of Public Health (JHSPH), "Underweight status ... and micronutrient deficiencies also cause decreases in immune and non-immune host defenses, and should be classified as underlying causes of death if followed by infectious diseases that are the terminal associated causes." People who are malnourished raise special concerns, as not only gross caloric intake may be inadequate, but also intake and absorption of other vital nutrients, especially essential amino acids and micronutrients such as vitamins and minerals.

In women, being severely underweight, often as a result of an eating disorder or due to excessive strenuous exercise, can result in amenorrhea (absence of menstruation), infertility or complications during pregnancy if gestational weight gain is too low.

Malnourishment can also cause anemia and hair loss.

Being underweight is an established risk factor for osteoporosis, even for young people. This is seen in individuals suffering from relative energy deficiency in sport, formerly known as female athlete triad: when disordered eating or excessive exercise cause amenorrhea, hormone changes during ovulation leads to loss of bone mineral density. After this low bone mineral density causes the first spontaneous fractures, the damage is often irreversible.

Although being underweight has been reported to increase mortality at rates comparable to that seen in morbidly obese people, the effect is much less drastic when restricted to non-smokers with no history of disease, suggesting that smoking and disease-related weight loss are the leading causes of the observed effect.

== Treatment ==
=== Diet ===
Underweight individuals may be advised to gain weight by increasing calorie intake. This can be done by eating a sufficient volume of sufficiently calorie-dense foods. Body weight may also be increased through the consumption of liquid nutritional supplements.

=== Exercise ===
Another way for underweight people to gain weight is by exercising, since muscle hypertrophy increases body mass. Weight lifting exercises are effective in helping to improve muscle tone as well as helping with weight gain. Weight lifting has also been shown to improve bone mineral density, which underweight people are more likely to lack.

Exercise is catabolic, which results in a brief reduction in mass. However, during recovery, anabolic overcompensation causes the muscles to grow, which results in an overall increase in mass. This can happen through an increase in muscle proteins, or through enhanced storage of glycogen in muscles. Exercise can also help stimulate the appetite of a person who is not inclined to eat.

=== Appetite stimulants ===
Certain drugs may increase appetite either as their primary effect or as a side effect. Antidepressants, such as mirtazapine or amitriptyline, and antipsychotics, particularly chlorpromazine and haloperidol, as well as tetrahydrocannabinol (found in cannabis), all present an increase in appetite as a side effect. In states where it is approved, medicinal cannabis may be prescribed for severe appetite loss, such as that caused by cancer, AIDS, or severe levels of persistent anxiety. Other drugs or supplements which may increase appetite include antihistamines (such as diphenhydramine, promethazine or cyproheptadine).

== See also ==
- Essential nutrient
- List of phytochemicals in food
- Body image
- Emaciation
- Malnutrition
- Stunted growth
