= McRoberts maneuver =

Obstetrical maneuver used to assist in childbirth

McRoberts maneuver (1) in combination with suprapubic pressure (2)

The McRoberts maneuver is an obstetrical technique where a laboring person's hips are sharply flexed, bringing their thighs towards their abdomen. The maneuver is performed to relieve cases of shoulder dystocia, in which the anterior or posterior shoulder of the infant is caught in the maternal pelvis preventing complete delivery. This position flattens the sacral promontory and rotates the pubic symphysis upward, releasing the infant’s impacted shoulder. It was popularized by Dr. William A. McRoberts Jr. at the University of Texas Medical School at Houston and first published on April 1, 1983. Since this time, it has become the first-line maneuver for relieving shoulder dystocia, per recommendations from the American College of Obstetricians and Gynecologists (ACOG) and the Royal College of Obstetricians and Gynecologists (RCOG) in the United Kingdom. The McRoberts position is often combined with suprapubic pressure which increases the success rate of the maneuver. The reported efficacy of the McRoberts maneuver in relieving shoulder dystocia is variable, with an average success rate of 75%.

== Technique ==
The McRoberts maneuver is performed with two assistants, each supporting one leg of the laboring patient, in addition to the delivering physician or midwife. Initially the laboring person is placed in lithotomy position, in which they are on their back with feet placed in stirrups or boots, and their buttocks at the bottom of the bed. The assistants then lift the maternal legs allowing the legs to fall outwards slightly and providing pressure on the foot, ankle, or posterior thigh directly above the knee to bring the patients thighs towards their abdomen, sharply flexing at the hips. The laboring patient may also assist with this maneuver or perform it independently, by holding the posterior aspect of their thighs and pulling their legs towards their abdomen. Elevation of the buttocks from the bed indicates adequate hip hyperflexion. The delivering physician or midwife provides gentle downward traction on the infants head, but lateral or significant downward traction should be avoided due to risk of injury to the fetus.

The McRoberts maneuver works to relieve shoulder dystocia by flattening the sacral promontory while rotating the pubic symphysis upward in the direction of the maternal head. This allows for the posterior shoulder of the fetus to rotate back into the true pelvis while the anterior shoulder drops below the pubic symphysis, freeing the impaction. Additionally, this position allows for the contractions of the uterus to align more optimally with the fetus in the vaginal canal, increasing the impact of the uterine contractions and maternal pushing efforts.

== Indications ==
The McRoberts maneuver is the first line intervention in the case of shoulder dystocia, which is an obstetric complication of up to 3% of normal vaginal deliveries. Most commonly, shoulder dystocia occurs when the anterior shoulder of the infant is caught on the pubic symphysis. Alternatively, the posterior shoulder can become impacted on the sacral promontory. In either instance, once the fetal head is delivered, the body of the fetus is compressed in the vaginal canal, decreasing blood flow through the umbilical cord and preventing adequate oxygen supply delivery to the infant.

Shoulder dystocia cannot reliably be predicted, but is more likely in patients with gestational diabetes, previous shoulder dystocia, and fetal macrosomia - meaning the fetus is significantly larger than average. The McRoberts maneuver may be used before there is known shoulder dystocia in cases with increased risk, but the position has not been observed to prevent shoulder dystocia or improve outcomes before clinical signs of shoulder dystocia appear.

== Contra-indications ==
The McRoberts maneuver is appropriate for most patients but is not recommended in cases of pelvic or spinal deformity, as these conditions prevent safe hip hyperflexion. Additionally, severe arthritis, morbid obesity, and neuromuscular disorders can prevent successful implementation of the McRoberts maneuver, but are not true contraindications.

== Complications ==
=== Maternal complications ===
The most common complications of the McRoberts maneuver for the laboring person are lower extremity neuropathies including weakness, sensory loss or paresthesia - often described as "pins and needles" - of the affected leg. This occurs due to compression of the femoral or femoral cutaneous nerve and is more likely when the McRoberts position is held for a prolonged time rather than in short intervals. These neuropathies are often temporary. Other extremely rare but possible complications are separation of the pubic symphysis or of the sacroiliac joint. Complications that occur at an increased rate when there is shoulder dystocia, but are not attributed to the McRoberts maneuver are postpartum hemorrhage and maternal anal sphincter injury due to fourth degree perineal laceration.

=== Fetal complications ===
The McRoberts maneuver is associated with the lowest risk for neonatal injury, and complications involving the fetus are more associated with the underlying shoulder dystocia than the maneuver itself. During the McRoberts maneuver the delivering physician or midwife places gentle downward traction on the fetal head, aggressive or lateral traction should be avoided as this may cause fetal injury. These complications include injury to the brachial plexus which can impair movement of the arm and hand. While the majority of cases resolve, permanent neurological damage occurs in approximately 10% of infants with a brachial plexus injury. Fractures to the clavicle or humerus can also occur.

== History ==
Dr. William A. McRoberts, Jr. popularized the McRoberts Maneuver at the University of Texas Medical School at Houston, where it was first published on April 1, 1983. The maneuver was unique at this time because it involved manipulation of the maternal position rather than the infant to facilitate delivery of the shoulders during instances of shoulder dystocia. At this time manipulation of the fetus was the first line method for relieving shoulder dystocia, which can be associated with higher risk for fetal injury. In 1997, the first trial to evaluate efficacy was performed and identified a 42% success rate in relieving shoulder dystocia when used alone. The mechanism was then analyzed radiographically in January of 2000 by x-ray pelvimetry demonstrating that the dimensions of the maternal pelvis were unchanged, but the flattening of the sacrum and anterior rotation of the pubic symphysis allowed passage of the fetal shoulders. These results have since been verified by additional studies, and the McRoberts maneuver is now widely accepted as the first line intervention for instances of shoulder dystocia.

== See also ==
- Wood's screw maneuver
- Zavanelli maneuver
- Shoulder dystocia
- Treatment of shoulder dystocia
- The mechanics of birth
