= Anterior shoulder =

Shoulder of the fetus

Anterior shoulder in obstetrics refers to that shoulder of the fetus that faces the pubic symphysis of the mother during delivery. Depending upon the original position of the fetus, either the left or the right shoulder can be the anterior shoulder. It is known as the anterior shoulder as it faces the anterior of the mother. This distinction between the anterior and the posterior shoulder is important as the anterior shoulder is delivered first.

== See also ==
- Posterior shoulder
- The mechanics of birth
- Shoulder dystocia
- Fetal relationship
