= Operative vaginal delivery =

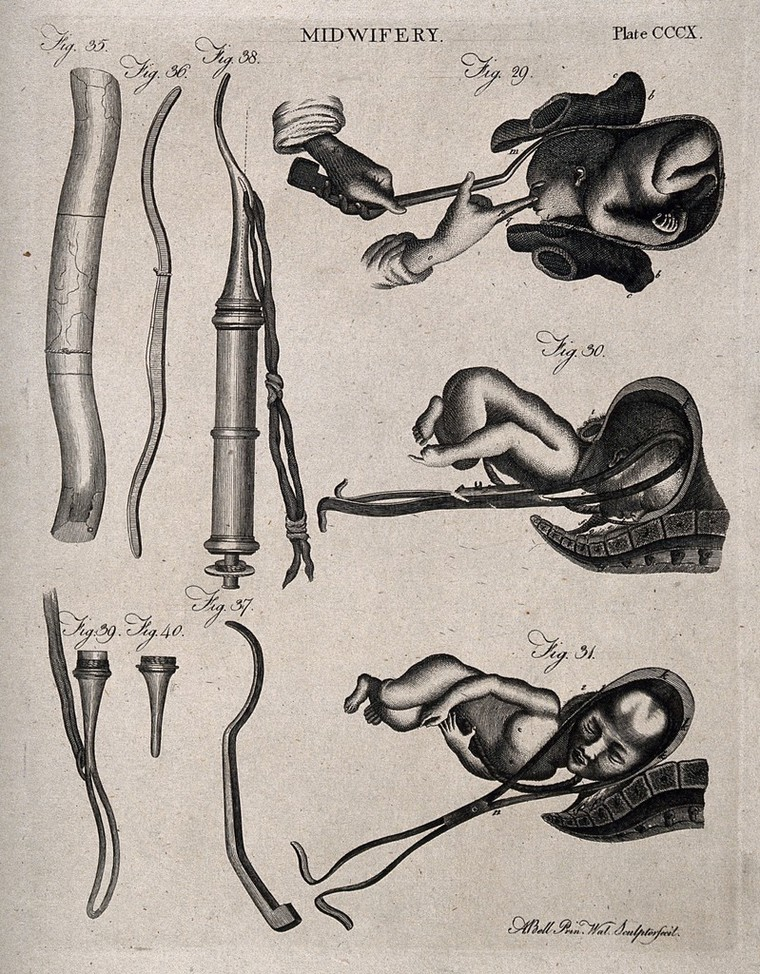
- Nine diagrams illustrating breech and natural births and the obstetrical instruments used to assist them circa 1800s
- Specialty: Obstetrics

Operative vaginal delivery, also known as assisted or instrumental vaginal delivery, is a vaginal delivery that is assisted by the use of forceps or a vacuum extractor.

Operative vaginal delivery is required in times of maternal or fetal distress to assist in childbirth as an alternative to caesarean section. Its use has decreased over the years in comparison to caesarean section. The two main instruments used are rotational forceps and vacuum extractors, each with different complication risks. Possible complications introduced with the use of instruments for the mother include pelvic floor injury, anal sphincter injury, bleeding, or cuts. Possible complications to the infant include bruising to the scalp, retinal bleeding, and scrapes to the scalp and face.

== Indications ==
When fetal distress occurs during the second stage of labor, operative vaginal delivery may be used in place of caesarean section which may pose additional risks after birth has progressed and the fetal head is deep in the birth canal. Maternal exhaustion and fetal distress would also be indications for appropriate use of operative vaginal delivery.

An analysis of multiple studies found that detecting the angle of the fetal head using an ultrasound is a reliable way to predict where uncomplicated operative vaginal delivery can be used, especially in first-time mothers.

=== Contraindications ===
Definite contraindication include non-engagement of the fetal head, unknown fetal position, cervix not fully dilated, membranes not ruptured, known loss of minerals from fetal bone, and fetal disorders.

Relative contraindication include less than 34 weeks of pregnancy, and less than 2400 grams of the total fetal weight.

== Benefits ==
Discharge from the hospital after operative vaginal delivery (2–3 days) is faster than after a caesarean section, which requires 4 days for discharge. It is suggested that this decrease in in-hospital recovery time reflects a decrease in pain and an increase in post-birth mobility for the mother. Using operative vaginal delivery avoids the risks associated with repeat caesarian sections or vaginal births after caesarian sections for women who want to have additional pregnancies. Compared to caesarean section, operative vaginal delivery have been more beneficial, and has been recognized to have a reduction in complications such as death, venous thromboembolism, costs of procedure, time of recovery and infection.

== Complications ==
=== Pelvic floor injury ===
The process of operative vaginal delivery can cause damage to the pelvic floor and anal sphincter. Obstetric anal sphincter injury (OASI) is a complication that can lead to short term morbidity and long term loss of bowel movement control. OASI is observed in about 5.7% of first time mothers and 1.5% in people who have given birth before with no prior OASI. In an 8-year study done at sub-Saharan hospitals, out of 100,307 vaginal deliveries, 2.1% resulted in OASI with forceps delivery found to have a higher incidence rate of 8.6% compared to 1.3% in normal vaginal deliveries.

While there does not appear to be a difference in long-term bowel or pelvic floor-related symptoms, studies of deliveries using forceps appear to show an association with being at an increased risk of long-term fecal incontinence. Forceps also have been shown to cause facial injury to the fetus and further significant injury to the mother via third‐ or fourth‐degree tears, vaginal trauma, and fecal incontinence. Although vacuum extractions can cause less injuries to the mother, it can cause more injury to the fetus via scalp injury and cephalhaematoma. Studies suggest that performing a episiotomy can reduce the risk of OASI in both forceps and vacuum-assisted deliveries.

Additionally, operative vaginal delivery increases the risk for postpartum hemorrhage and venous thromboembolism.

=== Post traumatic stress disorder ===
While statistics specific to PTSD following operative vaginal delivery are not available, studies show that 3-4% of all women and 20% of women in high risk groups will develop post traumatic stress disorder after birth. Operative deliveries are recognized as a risk factor for PTSD.

=== Newborn complications ===
One of the risks of operative vaginal delivery for the newborn, more common with the use of a vacuum, is cephalohematoma, or bruising under the scalp. Extensive bruising may increase the likelihood of clinically significant hyperbilirubinemia. Most of the time increased levels of total serum bilirubin in newborns is a harmless occurrence, however with high enough levels there would be a concern for brain damage.

Infants delivered by vacuum extraction have a higher rate of retinal hemorrhage compared to infants delivered without instrument assistance. It is believed that suction on the head increases intracranial pressure which may cause an increase in arterial blood pressure in the eye leading to retinal bleeding.

Newborns undergoing operative delivery have a higher likelihood of experiencing shoulder dystocia, a delivery emergency that may lead to further injury such as brachial plexus palsy. Scalp and facial injuries leading to fractures and bleeding may be possible.

== Epidemiology ==
Operative vaginal delivery has decreased as second stage caesarean section has become more common, in the United Kingdom 12.7% of women and up to 25% of first time mothers undergo operative vaginal delivery as of 2019. Globally, this percentage decreases to 2.6%. Between 2005 and 2013, 1.1% of vaginal deliveries in the United States were forceps-assisted.

== Technique ==
The procedure relies primarily on either a pair of curved forceps blades or a vacuum extractor that applies negative pressure inside the womb. The forceps are designed to reach the top of the fetal head and create the necessary traction to pull and rotate the baby out. On the other hand, the vacuum extractor uses a small metal or silicon cap that exerts negative pressure on the fetal scalp to facilitate pulling of the infant. Since vacuum extraction can cause less injuries to the mother than forceps-assisted delivery, it is the preferred technique in some countries.

=== Rotational forceps ===
Rotational forceps are used to turn the head of the fetus so that it is in the correct position. Rotational forceps, also referred to as Kielland's forceps, were first described by Norwegian obstetrician Christian Kielland in 1908. Their use declined during the twentieth century because they were associated with risks to the mother and baby; however, both the American Congress of Obstetricians and Gynecologists and Royal College of Obstetricians and Gynaecologists (RCOG) from the United Kingdom support the use of rotational forceps by practitioners who have the experience and skill to do so. Neither organization has specific training guidelines, although the RCOG suggests that training should include direct senior supervision and an assessment of skills in the workplace.

An analysis of 4 studies showed that the use of rotational forceps had low rates of postpartum hemorrhage and obstetric anal sphincter injury to the mother. Additionally, neonatal complication rates were similar to those seen with other methods for assisted birth, such as the use of a vacuum cup, manual rotation, or second-stage cesarean section.

An additional analysis of 31 studies found that forceps were more likely to lead to vaginal birth than vacuum cups, but were more likely to have perineal tears to the anus or rectum. There was no difference in postpartum hemorrhage rates for the mother and no difference in Apgar scores to the baby post birth.

=== Vacuum suction ===
Vacuum suction can have either rigid or flexible cups, and can be operated with handheld devices or a foot-operated electric pump. Evidence suggests that rigid cups may have higher success rates than soft cups, but may be more likely to cause fetal trauma.

== Recovery ==
=== Post-delivery care ===
Injuries such as tears, cuts, or bruises to the birth canal, cervix, anus, or vaginal openings will be assessed and addressed. For example, tears to the vaginal openings will be stitched to prevent blood loss.

Physical exam, hearing and vision tests, imaging will be assessed for the neonate for any signs of trauma. When forceps are used for operative vaginal delivery, the recovery process takes a little longer. When there are injuries such as tears, it takes about six weeks to heal. Stitches used for vaginal openings takes a month to fully absorb before they start disappearing completely. Wearing a postpartum pad is recommended when there is bleeding and to prevent infections. Healthcare providers should be consulted if excess pain occurs so that pain medications can be prescribed or gotten over-the-counter.

=== Antibiotics ===
Operative vaginal delivery presents an opportunity for infection due to trauma to the tissue, vaginal examination and instrumentation, and bladder catheterization with 0.7–16% of operative vaginal births leading to infections. Guidelines from the World Health Organization (WHO) support the use of intravenous antibiotics for the mother as soon as possible after birth but can be used up to within 6 hours after birth. The recommended antibiotic combination would be amoxicillin and clavulanic acid, but if they are not available antibiotics with similar activity can be used. Due to the use of either forceps or vacuum in operative vaginal deliveries, there has been an increase in maternal infection and in some cases, readmission after delivery due to the infection. The effectiveness of antibiotic prophylaxis was studied in both the use of either forceps or vacuum in operative delivery to reduce the risk of infection. The result showed that antibiotic prophylaxis has been shown to effectively reduce infections in operative vaginal deliveries, and should be used.

== History ==
The concept of forceps for vaginal delivery was invented by Peter Chamberlin in the 1600 which helped became the instrument used in operative vaginal delivery. The use of this instrument for operative vaginal delivery dates back to the 1600's. Throughout history, over 700 types of forceps have been reinvented and gone through modifications to make sure forceps are safe in operative vaginal delivery. Half of first-time mothers had forceps-assisted deliveries in the 1960s.

The vacuum extractor was developed in the mid-1900s, and its use in delivery became more common than forceps in 1992. James Young Simpson in 1849 invented the air tractor used in vacuum extraction to help with operative vaginal delivery. In the early 1950's, Tage Malmstrom developed a modern vacuum extraction that came with modifications for delivery.
