= Zavanelli maneuver =

Obstetric maneuver

The Zavanelli maneuver is an obstetric maneuver that involves pushing back the delivered fetal head into the birth canal in anticipation of performing a cesarean section in cases of shoulder dystocia.

The Zavanelli maneuver is performed only after other maneuvers have failed, as it is associated with high risk to both the mother and the fetus. A review published in 1985 found that 84 of 92 cases of Zavanelli maneuver were successful in replacing the head of the fetus back into the uterus. Risks of the maneuver to the mother include soft tissue damage and puerperal sepsis. The Zavanelli maneuver is not performed very often in the United States. It is named after William Angelo "Bill" Zavanelli (born October 10, 1926), who performed the procedure on January 18, 1978 as a clinical instructor in obstetrics and gynecology at the University of California, San Francisco.

== See also ==
- McRoberts maneuver
- Wood's screw maneuver
- Shoulder dystocia
- Treatment of shoulder dystocia
- The mechanics of birth
