= Wood's screw maneuver =

Practiced in obstetrics when dealing with shoulder dystoci

Wood's screw maneuver is practiced in obstetrics when dealing with shoulder dystocia – a condition in which the fetal shoulders cannot easily pass through the vagina. In this maneuver the anterior shoulder is pushed towards the baby's chest, and the posterior shoulder is pushed towards the baby's back, making the baby's head somewhat face the mother's rectum.

This maneuver is tried only after the McRoberts maneuver, and application of suprapubic (lower abdomen) pressure have been tried.

It is named after Charles Edwin Woods, who was the first to examine this maneuver in detail.

== See also ==
- McRoberts maneuver
- Zavanelli maneuver
- Shoulder dystocia
- The mechanics of birth
