= Posterior shoulder =

Posterior shoulder in obstetrics refers to the shoulder of the fetus other than the anterior shoulder. Thus, the posterior shoulder faces the rectum of the mother during delivery. Whether left or the right shoulder becomes the posterior shoulder is dependent upon the original position of the fetus. It is known as the posterior shoulder as it faces the posterior of the mother. This distinction between the anterior and the posterior shoulder is important as the anterior shoulder is delivered first.

== See also ==
- Anterior shoulder
- Fetal relationship
- Mechanism of vaginal birth
- Shoulder dystocia
