= Gestational diabetes =

High blood sugar levels during pregnancy

- Other names: Gestational diabetes mellitus (GDM)
- Universal blue circle symbol for diabetes
- Specialty: Obstetrics and endocrinology
- Symptoms: Typically few symptoms
- Complications: Pre-eclampsia, stillbirth, depression, increased risk of requiring a caesarean section
- Usual onset: Most common last three months of pregnancy
- Causes: Not enough insulin in the setting of insulin resistance
- Risk factors: Overweight, previously having gestational diabetes, family history of type 2 diabetes, polyendocrine metabolic ovarian syndrome
- Diagnostic method: Screening blood tests
- Prevention: Maintaining a healthy weight and exercising before pregnancy
- Treatment: Diabetic diet, exercise, insulin injections
- Frequency: ~6% of pregnancies

Gestational diabetes is a condition in which an individual without diabetes develops high blood sugar levels during pregnancy. Gestational diabetes generally results in few symptoms. Obesity increases the rate of pre-eclampsia, cesarean sections, and embryo macrosomia, as well as gestational diabetes. Babies born to individuals with poorly treated gestational diabetes are at increased risk of macrosomia, of having hypoglycemia after birth, and of jaundice. If untreated, diabetes can also result in stillbirth. Long term, children are at higher risk of being overweight and of developing type 2 diabetes.

Gestational diabetes can occur during pregnancy because of insulin resistance or reduced production of insulin. Risk factors include being overweight, previously having gestational diabetes, a family history of type 2 diabetes, and having polyendocrine metabolic ovarian syndrome. Diagnosis is by blood tests. For those at normal risk, screening is recommended between 24 and 28 weeks' gestation. For those at high risk, testing may occur at the first prenatal visit.

Maintaining a healthy weight and exercising before pregnancy assists in prevention. Gestational diabetes is treated with a healthy eating plan, exercise, medication (such as metformin), and sometimes insulin injections. Most people manage blood sugar with diet and exercise. Blood sugar testing among those affected is often recommended four times daily. Breastfeeding is recommended as soon as possible after birth.

Gestational diabetes affects 3–9% of pregnancies, depending on the population studied. It is especially common during the third trimester. It affects 1% of those under the age of 20 and 13% of those over the age of 44. Several ethnic groups including Asians, American Indians, Indigenous Australians, and Pacific Islanders are at higher risk. However, the variations in prevalence are also due to different screening strategies and diagnostic criteria. In 90% of cases, gestational diabetes resolves after the baby is born. Affected people, however, are at an increased risk of developing type 2 diabetes.

== Classification ==
Gestational diabetes is formally defined as "any degree of glucose intolerance with onset or first recognition during pregnancy". This definition acknowledges the possibility that a woman may have previously undiagnosed diabetes mellitus or may have developed diabetes coincidentally with pregnancy. Whether symptoms subside after pregnancy is also irrelevant to the diagnosis. A woman is diagnosed with gestational diabetes when glucose intolerance continues beyond 24 to 28 weeks of gestation.

The White classification, named after Priscilla White, who pioneered research on the effect of diabetes types on perinatal outcome, is widely used to assess maternal and fetal risk. It distinguishes between gestational diabetes (type A) and pregestational diabetes (diabetes that existed before pregnancy). These two groups are further subdivided according to their associated risks and management.

The two subtypes of gestational diabetes under this classification system are:

- Type A1: abnormal oral glucose tolerance test (OGTT), but normal blood glucose levels during fasting and two hours after meals; diet modification is sufficient to control glucose levels
- Type A2: abnormal OGTT compounded by abnormal glucose levels during fasting or after meals; additional therapy with insulin or other medications is required

Diabetes which existed before pregnancy is also split up into several subtypes under this system:

- Type B: onset at age 20 or older and duration of less than 10 years.
- Type C: onset at age 10–19 or duration of 10–19 years.
- Type D: onset before age 10 or duration greater than 20 years.
- Type E: overt diabetes mellitus with calcified pelvic vessels.
- Type F: diabetic nephropathy.
- Type R: proliferative retinopathy.
- Type RF: retinopathy and nephropathy.
- Type H: ischemic heart disease.
- Type T: prior kidney transplant.

An early age of onset or long-standing disease comes with greater risks, hence the first three subtypes.

Two other sets of criteria are available to diagnose gestational diabetes, both based on blood-sugar levels.

Criteria for diagnosis of gestational diabetes, using the 100-gram Glucose Tolerance Test, according to Carpenter and Coustan:

- Fasting 95 mg/dl
- 1 hour 180 mg/dl
- 2 hours 155 mg/dl
- 3 hours 140 mg/dl

Criteria for diagnosis of gestational diabetes according to National Diabetes Data Group:

- Fasting 105 mg/dl
- 1 hour 190 mg/dl
- 2 hours 165 mg/dl
- 3 hours 145 mg/dl

The third criterion used was endorsed by the Diabetes in Pregnancy Study Group India and approved by the National Health Mission in its Guidelines DIPSI(Diabetes in Pregnancy Study Group India Guidelines)

OGTT is performed in pregnant women by measuring the plasma glucose after 2 hours of fasting or non-fasting after ingesting 75 grams of glucose (Monohydrate Dextrose Anhydrous). The Indian Guidelines (DIPSI Test) are simple for diagnosing gestational diabetes (GDM). They can be done quickly in low-resource settings, where many pregnant women visit for ANC check-ups in a Non-fasting state. A single value of ≥140 mg/dl is diagnostic for Gestational Diabetes Mellitus.

Guidelines to screen glucose intolerance at appropriate Gestational weeks: Prediction of GDM can be done if the 2-hour PPBG is ≥110 mg/dl at the 10th week. At the 8th week itself, PPBG needs to be estimated because, in case PPBG is > 110 mg/dl at this week, a grace period of 2 weeks is available to bring it down to PPBG <110 mg/dl at the 10th week with metformin 250 mg twice a day, in addition to Medical Nutritional Therapy (MNT) and exercise.

== Risk factors ==
Classical risk factors for developing gestational diabetes are:

- Polyendocrine metabolic ovarian syndrome
- A previous diagnosis of gestational diabetes or prediabetes, impaired glucose tolerance, or impaired fasting glycaemia
- A family history revealing a first-degree relative with type 2 diabetes
- Maternal age – a woman's risk factor increases as she gets older (especially for women over 35 years of age).
- Paternal age – one study found that a father's age over 55 years was associated with GD
- Ethnicity (those with higher risk factors include African Americans, Afro-Caribbeans, Native Americans, Hispanics, Pacific Islanders, and people originating from South Asia)
- Being overweight, obese, or severely obese increases the risk by a factor of 2.1, 3.6, and 8.6, respectively.
- A previous pregnancy which resulted in a child with a macrosomia (high birth weight: >90th centile or >4000 g (8 lbs 12.8 oz))
- Previous poor obstetric history
- Other genetic risk factors: There are at least 10 genes where certain polymorphism are associated with an increased risk of gestational diabetes, most notably TCF7L2. The MTNR1B gene is a common gene that is associated with how the body handles insulin and glucose. When this gene is not working properly, it can lead to less insulin production and higher blood glucose levels.

In addition to this, statistics show a double risk of GDM in smokers. Some studies have looked at more controversial potential risk factors, such as short stature.

About 40–60% of women with GDM have no demonstrable risk factor; for this reason, many advocate for screening all women. Typically, women with GDM exhibit no symptoms (another reason for universal screening), but some women may demonstrate increased thirst, increased urination, fatigue, nausea and vomiting, bladder infection, yeast infections and blurred vision.

Pregnant women with these risk factors may need to undergo an early screening in addition to the routine screening.

== Pathophysiology ==
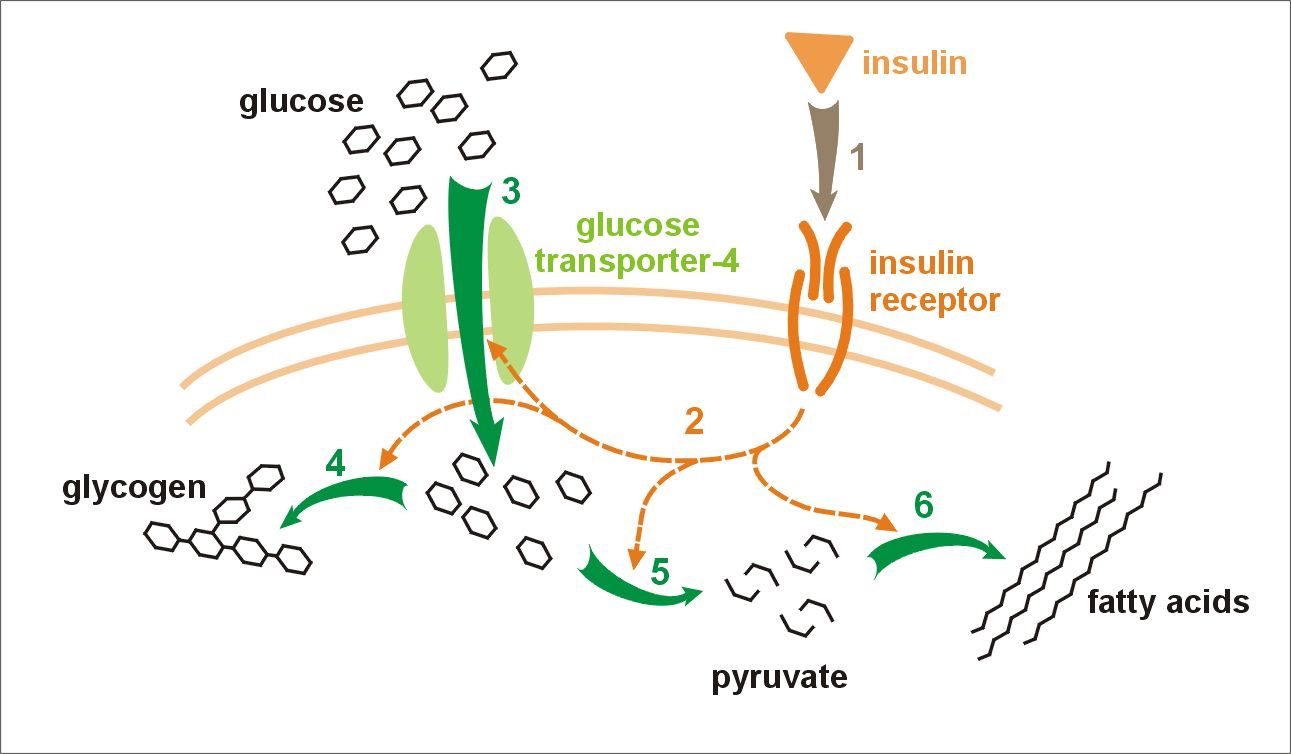
Effect of insulin on glucose uptake and metabolism. Insulin binds to its receptor (1) on the cell membrane, which starts many protein activation cascades (2). These include: translocation of Glut-4 transporter to the plasma membrane and influx of glucose (3), glycogen synthesis (4), glycolysis (5) and fatty acid synthesis (6).

The precise mechanisms underlying gestational diabetes remain unknown. The hallmark of GDM is increased insulin resistance. Pregnancy hormones and other factors are thought to interfere with the action of insulin as it binds to the insulin receptor. The interference probably occurs at the level of the cell signaling pathway beyond the insulin receptor. Since insulin promotes the entry of glucose into most cells, insulin resistance prevents glucose from entering the cells properly. As a result, glucose remains in the bloodstream, where glucose levels rise. More insulin is needed to overcome this resistance; about 1.5–2.5 times more insulin is produced than in a normal pregnancy.

Insulin resistance is a normal phenomenon emerging in the second trimester of pregnancy, which in cases of GDM progresses thereafter to levels seen in a non-pregnant woman with type 2 diabetes. It is thought to secure glucose supply to the growing fetus. Women with GDM have an insulin resistance that they cannot compensate for with increased production in the β-cells of the pancreas. Placental hormones, and, to a lesser extent, increased fat deposits during pregnancy, seem to mediate insulin resistance during pregnancy. Cortisol and progesterone are the main culprits, but human placental lactogen, prolactin and estradiol contribute, too. Multivariate stepwise regression analysis reveals that, in combination with other placental hormones, leptin, tumor necrosis factor alpha, and resistin are involved in the decrease in insulin sensitivity occurring during pregnancy, with tumor necrosis factor alpha named as the strongest independent predictor of insulin sensitivity in pregnancy. An inverse correlation with the changes in insulin sensitivity from the time before conception through late gestation accounts for about half of the variance in the decrease in insulin sensitivity during gestation: in other words, low levels or alteration of TNF alpha factors correspond with a greater chance of, or predisposition to, insulin resistance or sensitivity.

It is unclear why some women are unable to balance insulin needs and develop GDM; however, several explanations have been given, similar to those in type 2 diabetes: autoimmunity, single gene mutations, obesity, along with other mechanisms.

Though the clinical presentation of gestational diabetes is well characterized, the biochemical mechanism behind the disease is not well known. One proposed biochemical mechanism involves insulin-producing β-cell adaptation controlled by the HGF/c-MET signaling pathway. β-cell adaptation refers to the change that pancreatic islet cells undergo during pregnancy in response to maternal hormones to compensate for the increased physiological needs of the mother and baby. These changes in the β-cells cause increased insulin secretion due to increased β-cell proliferation. HGF/c-MET has also been implicated in β-cell regeneration, which suggests that HGF/c-MET may help increase β-cell mass to compensate for insulin needs during pregnancy. Recent studies support that loss of HGF/c-MET signaling results in aberrant β-cell adaptation.

c-MET is a receptor tyrosine kinase (RTK) that is activated by its ligand, hepatocyte growth factor (HGF), and is involved in the activation of several cellular processes. When HGF binds c-MET, the receptor homodimerizes and self-phosphorylates to form an SH2 recognition domain. The downstream pathways activated include common signaling molecules such as RAS and MAPK, which affect cell motility and cell cycle progression.

Studies have shown that HGF is an important signaling molecule in stress-related situations where more insulin is needed. Pregnancy causes increased insulin resistance and a higher insulin demand. The β-cells must compensate for this by either increasing insulin production or proliferating. If neither of the processes occurs, then markers for gestational diabetes are observed. It has been observed that pregnancy increases HGF levels, showing a correlation that suggests a connection between the signaling pathway and increased insulin needs. When no signaling is present, gestational diabetes is more likely to occur.

The exact mechanism of HGF/c-MET regulated β-cell adaptation is not yet known. Several hypotheses about how the signaling molecules contribute to insulin levels during pregnancy have been proposed. c-MET may interact with FoxM1, a molecule important in the cell cycle, as FOXM1 levels decrease when c-MET is not present. Additionally, c-MET may interact with p27 as the protein levels increase when c-MET is not present. Another hypothesis says that c-MET may control β-cell apoptosis because a lack of c-MET causes increased cell death, but the signaling mechanisms have not been elucidated.

Although the mechanism of HGF/c-MET control of gestational diabetes is not yet well understood, there is a strong correlation between the signaling pathway and the inability to produce an adequate amount of insulin during pregnancy, and thus it may be the target for future diabetic therapies.

Because glucose travels across the placenta (through diffusion facilitated by GLUT1 carrier), which is located in the syncytiotrophoblast on both the microvilli and basal membranes, these membranes may be the rate-limiting step in placental glucose transport. There is a two- to three-fold increase in the expression of syncytiotrophoblast glucose transporters with advancing gestation. Finally, the role of GLUT3/GLUT4 transport remains speculative. If the untreated gestational diabetes fetus is exposed to consistently higher glucose levels, this leads to increased fetal levels of insulin (insulin itself cannot cross the placenta). The growth-stimulating effects of insulin can lead to excessive growth and a large body (macrosomia). After birth, the high glucose environment disappears, leaving these newborns with ongoing high insulin production and susceptibility to low blood glucose levels (hypoglycemia).

== Screening ==
Tests for gestational diabetes
Non-challenge blood glucose test
- Fasting glucose test
- 2-hour postprandial (after a meal) glucose test
- Random glucose test
Screening glucose challenge test
Oral glucose tolerance test (OGTT)

Several screening and diagnostic tests have been used to look for high levels of glucose in plasma or serum in defined circumstances. One method is a stepwise approach where a suspicious result on a screening test is followed by a diagnostic test. Alternatively, a more involved diagnostic test can be used directly at the first prenatal visit for a woman with a high-risk pregnancy. (for example, in those with polyendocrine metabolic ovarian syndrome or acanthosis nigricans).

Non-challenge blood glucose tests involve measuring glucose levels in blood samples without challenging the subject with glucose solutions. A blood glucose level is determined when fasting, two hours after a meal, or at any random time. In contrast, challenge tests involve drinking a glucose solution and measuring glucose concentration thereafter in the blood; in diabetes, they tend to remain high. The glucose solution has a very sweet taste, which some women find unpleasant; sometimes, therefore, artificial flavours are added. Some women may experience nausea during the test, and more so with higher glucose levels.

There is currently not enough research to show which way is best at diagnosing gestational diabetes. Routine screening of women with a glucose challenge test may find more women with gestational diabetes than only screening women with risk factors. Hemoglobin A^{1c} (HbA1c) is not recommended for diagnosing gestational diabetes, as it is a less reliable marker of glycemia during pregnancy than oral glucose tolerance testing (OGTT).

Because women diagnosed with Gestational Diabetes (GDM) during pregnancy are at an increased risk for developing Type 2 Diabetes Mellitus after pregnancy, post-pregnancy glucose tolerance testing is needed. Based on the recent meta-analysis conducted by the Patient-Centered Outcomes Research Institute, research has shown that post pregnancy testing reminders are associated with greater adherence to oral glucose tolerance testing up to 1 year postpartum.

=== Pathways ===
Opinions differ about optimal screening and diagnostic measures, partly due to differences in population risks, cost-effectiveness considerations, and lack of an evidence base to support large national screening programs. The most elaborate regimen entails a random blood glucose test during a booking visit, a screening glucose challenge test around 24–28 weeks' gestation, followed by an OGTT if the tests are outside normal limits. If there is a high suspicion, a woman may be tested earlier.

In the United States, most obstetricians prefer universal screening with a screening glucose challenge test. In the United Kingdom, obstetric units often rely on risk factors and a random blood glucose test. The American Diabetes Association and the Society of Obstetricians and Gynaecologists of Canada recommend routine screening unless the woman is low risk (this means the woman must be younger than 25 years and have a body mass index less than 27, with no personal, ethnic or family risk factors) The Canadian Diabetes Association and the American College of Obstetricians and Gynecologists recommend universal screening. The U.S. Preventive Services Task Force found there is insufficient evidence to recommend for or against routine screening, and a 2017 a Cochrane review found that there is not evidence to determine which screening method is best for women and their babies.

Some pregnant women and care providers choose to forgo routine screening due to the absence of risk factors; however, this is not advised due to the large proportion of women who develop gestational diabetes despite having no risk factors present and the dangers to the mother and baby if gestational diabetes remains untreated.

=== Non-challenge blood glucose tests ===
When a plasma glucose level is found to be higher than 126 mg/dL (7.0 mmol/L) after fasting, or over 200 mg/dL (11.1 mmol/L) on any occasion, and if this is confirmed on a subsequent day, the diagnosis of GDM is made, and no further testing is required. These tests are typically performed at the first antenatal visit. They are simple to administer and inexpensive, but have a lower test performance compared to the other tests, with moderate sensitivity, low specificity, and high false positive rates.

=== Screening glucose challenge test ===
The screening glucose challenge test (sometimes called the O'Sullivan test) is performed between 24 and 28 weeks and can be seen as a simplified version of the oral glucose tolerance test (OGTT). No previous fasting is required for this screening test, in contrast to the OGTT. The O'Sullivan test involves drinking a solution containing 50 grams of glucose and measuring blood levels one hour later.

If the cut-off point is set at 140 mg/dL (7.8 mmol/L), 80% of women with GDM will be detected. If this threshold for further testing is lowered to 130 mg/dL, 90% of GDM cases will be detected, but there will also be more women who will be subjected to a consequent OGTT unnecessarily.

=== Oral glucose tolerance test ===
A standardized oral glucose tolerance test (OGTT) should be done in the morning after an overnight fast of between 8 and 14 hours. During the three previous days, the subject must have an unrestricted diet (containing at least 150 g carbohydrate per day) and unlimited physical activity. The subject should remain seated during the test and should not smoke throughout the test.

IADPSG (International Association of Diabetes and Pregnancy Study Groups) has developed diagnostic criteria for GDM, based on the results of adverse pregnancy outcomes in the Hyperglycemia and Adverse Pregnancy Outcomes (HAPO) study. These were recommended by WHO 2013.

According to these, gestational diabetes mellitus should be diagnosed at any time in pregnancy if one of the following criteria is met, using a 75 g glucose OGTT:

- Fasting blood glucose level ≥92 mg/dL (5.1 mmol/L)
- 1 hour blood glucose level ≥180 mg/dL (10 mmol/L)
- 2 hour blood glucose level ≥153 mg/dL (8.5 mmol/L)

=== Urinary glucose testing ===
Women with GDM may have high glucose levels in their urine (glucosuria). Although dipstick testing is widely practiced, it performs poorly, and discontinuing routine dipstick testing has not been shown to cause underdiagnosis where universal screening is performed. Increased glomerular filtration rates during pregnancy contribute to some 50% of women having glucose in their urine on dipstick tests at some point during their pregnancy. Glomerular filtration rates increase during pregnancy due to an increase in blood volume to support the fetus. The sensitivity of glucosuria for GDM in the first two trimesters is only around 10%, and the positive predictive value is around 20%.

== Prevention ==
Vitamin D supplementation during pregnancy may help to prevent gestational diabetes. A 2015 review found that when done during pregnancy moderate physical exercise is effective for the prevention of gestational diabetes. A 2014 review, however, did not find a significant effect. It is uncertain if additional dietary advice interventions help to reduce the risk of gestational diabetes. However, data from the Nurses' Health Study shows that adherence to a healthy plant-based diet is associated with lower risk for GDM. Diet and physical activity interventions designed to prevent excessive gestational weight gain reduce the rates of gestational diabetes. However, the impact of these interventions varies with the body mass index of the person as well as with the region in which the studies were performed.

Moderate-quality evidence suggests that there is a reduced risk of gestational diabetes mellitus and caesarean section with combined diet and exercise interventions during pregnancy, as well as reductions in gestational weight gain, compared with standard care. There is no clear evidence that taking metformin while pregnant reduces the risk of developing gestational diabetes, though some evidence has associated its use with reduced maternal weight gain during pregnancy.

A 2023 review found that a plant-based diet (including fruits, vegetables, whole grains, nuts and seeds, and tea) rich in phytochemicals lowers the risk of GDM. A Cochrane review, updated 2023, stated that myo‐inositol has a potential beneficial effect of improving insulin sensitivity, which suggested that it may be useful for women in preventing gestational diabetes″.

It has been suggested that for women who have had gestational diabetes, diet, exercise, education, and lifestyle changes between pregnancies may lower their chances of having gestational diabetes again in future pregnancies. For women with a normal BMI pre-pregnancy, light to moderate exercise for 30-60 minutes three times a week during pregnancy can decrease the occurrence of GDM. It was found that women who completed at least 600 MET-min/week of moderate intensity exercise can cause at least a 25% reduction in the odds of developing GDM. When studying the difference effects between aerobic and resistance training, it was found that there were no differences in fasting blood glucose levels, insulin utilization rate, or pregnancy outcomes. However, there was a better improvement in the 2-hour postprandial blood glucose level. The resistance training group was also more compliant with their workout program than the aerobic group. Based on this information, resistance training may be a better option for women with gestational diabetes, but doing both aerobic training and resistance training would be optimal.

== Management ==
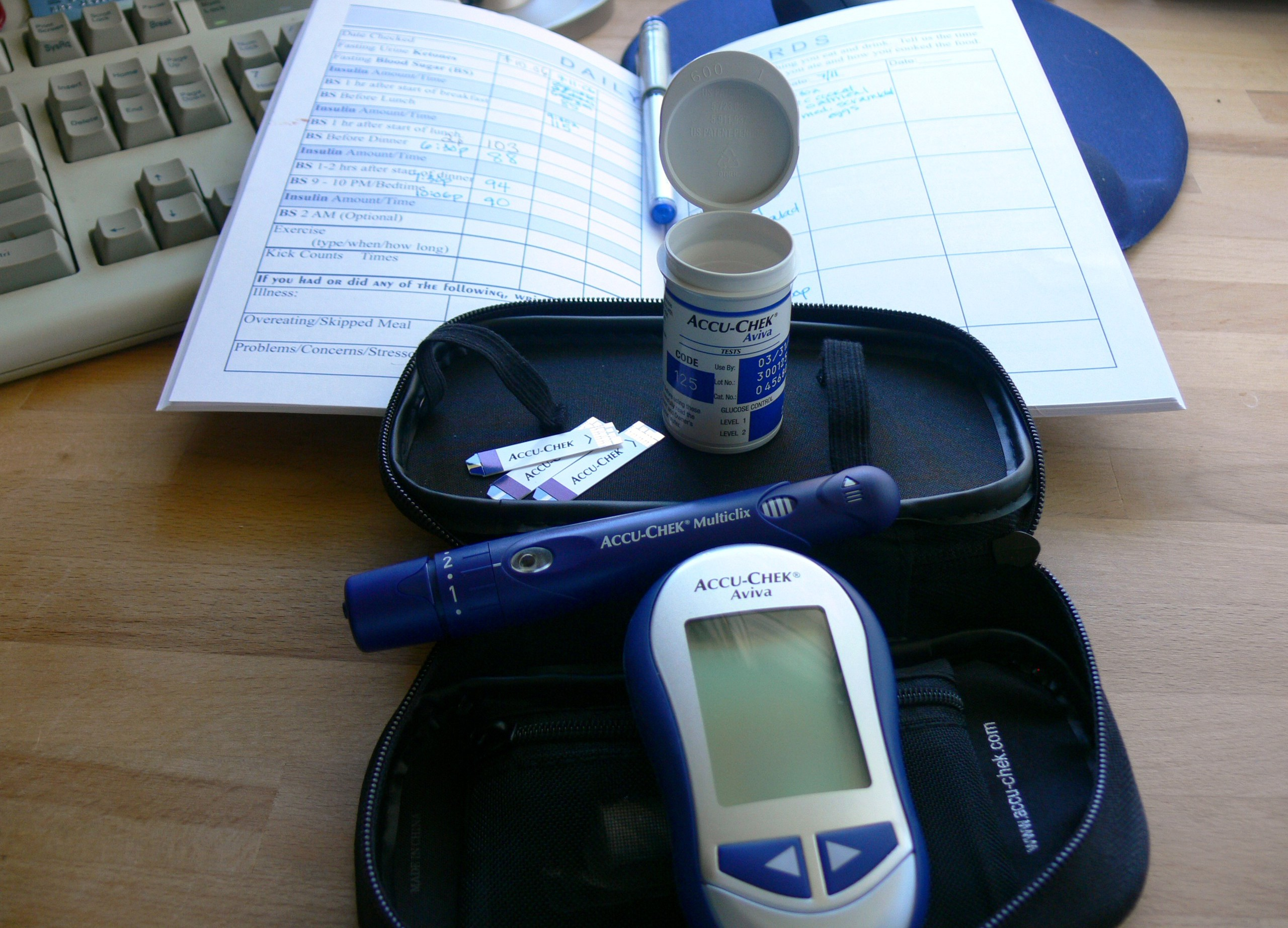
A kit with a glucose meter and diary used by a woman with gestational diabetes

Treatment of GDM with diet and insulin reduces health problems for the mother and child. Treatment of GDM is also accompanied by more inductions of labour.

A repeat OGTT should be carried out 6 weeks after delivery, to confirm that diabetes has disappeared. Afterwards, regular screening for type 2 diabetes is advised.

Lifestyle interventions include exercise, diet advice, behavioural interventions, relaxation, self-monitoring of glucose, and combined interventions. Women with gestational diabetes who receive lifestyle interventions seem to have less postpartum depression, and were more likely to reach their weight loss targets after giving birth, than women who had no intervention. Their babies are also less likely to be large for their gestational age, and have less percentage of fat when they are born. More research is needed to discover the most effective lifestyle interventions. Some women with GDM use probiotics, but it is very uncertain if there are any benefits in terms of blood glucose levels, high blood pressure disorders, or induction of labour.

If a diabetic diet or G.I. Diet, exercise, and oral medication are inadequate to control glucose levels; insulin therapy may become necessary.

The development of macrosomia can be evaluated during pregnancy by using sonography. Women who use insulin, with a history of stillbirth, or with hypertension are managed like women with overt diabetes.

Researchers have found ways for pregnant women with gestational diabetes to reduce their complications with their current health, long-term effects, and fetal health with the help of exercise. Laredo-Aguilera, et al., and Dipla, et al., presented findings from systematic and meta-analyses that showed positive effects of resistance exercise or a combination of resistance and aerobic exercise. Aerobic and resistance training were found to control glucose, HgbA1c, and insulin levels in women with GDM. Not only is the mother's health affected, but also the fetus's. If GDM is not treated or is made worse, the child may suffer from macrosomia, impaired intrauterine growth, obstetric trauma, hyperbilirubinemia, hypoglycemia, or even infection. Pregnant women with GDM who are overweight or obese are at a greater risk of passing down these negative effects by 2.14-3.56 times. Benefits to resistance and aerobic exercise include a maternal decrease in cramps, lower back pain, edema, depression, urinary incontinence, duration of labor, constipation, and the number of c-sections. These benefits can affect the fetus by having a decreased body fat mass, improved stress tolerance, and advanced neurobehavioral maturation. In the article written by Laredo-Aguilera, et al., there were seven interventions and seven different countries that were used for research. Within all of the interventions, there were significant improvements in glucose concentration, reduced requirements of insulin injections, postprandial glucose level control, and glycemic control. The study reviewed by Dipla, et al., found that even a single exercise bout increases skeletal muscle glucose uptake, minimizing hyperglycemia. Regular exercise training has been found to promote mitochondrial biogenesis, improve oxidative capacity, enhance insulin sensitivity and vascular function, and reduce systemic inflammation in women with GDM. Women with GDM must provide enough glucose to the fetus, but often become insulin-resistant. Exercise has been previously known to be dangerous for women during pregnancy, but now multiple studies have found otherwise. Women with gestational diabetes need to measure their heart rate reserve to determine exercise intensity and exercise at an RPE between 12 and 14.

=== Lifestyle ===
Counselling before pregnancy (for example, about preventive folic acid supplements) and multidisciplinary management are important for good pregnancy outcomes. Most women can manage their GDM with dietary changes and exercise. Self-monitoring of blood glucose levels can guide therapy. Some women will need antidiabetic drugs, most commonly insulin therapy.

Any diet needs to provide sufficient calories for pregnancy, typically 2,000–2,500 kcal with the exclusion of simple carbohydrates. The main goal of dietary modifications is to avoid peaks in blood sugar levels. This can be done by spreading carbohydrate intake over meals and snacks throughout the day, and using slow-release carbohydrate sources—known as the G.I. Diet. Since insulin resistance is highest in the morning, breakfast carbohydrates must be restricted more.

The Mediterranean diet may be associated with reduced incidence of gestational diabetes. However, there is not enough evidence to indicate if one type of dietary advice is better than another.

Though there is no specific structure for exercise programs for GDM, it is understood that being subjected to constant exposure to a sedentary lifestyle and participating in <2999 MET-mins a week in physical activity is linked to a 10 times higher risk of developing GDM. Conversely, partaking in > 3000 MET-mins of any physical activity can reduce developing GDM. However, light intensity walking is an effective way to help control casual glucose level (CGL), but a minimum of 6000 steps must be achieved daily to have consistent effectiveness in controlling CGL.Nevertheless, there is no significant correlation between light intensity walking and HbA1c, therefore regular moderate intensity exercise is advised, specifically aerobic exercise has been proven to improve both fasting and postprandial blood glucose, insulin dosage, and insulin usage within the body. It is still contested which form of exercise/physical activity is best for pregnant women, yet some movement is better than no movement.

Although exercise does not reduce the risk of developing GDM, it does help reduce some of the associated risks. When it comes to exercise in pregnant women who have GDM there is a decrease in the risk of having a newborn with macrosomia, decrease in maternal weight gain and a decrease in c-sections. Although exercise is not the cure for GDM, it does help pregnant women decrease any complications or risk factors that can arise from the disease.

Self-monitoring can be accomplished using a handheld capillary glucose dosage system. Compliance with these glucometer systems can be low. There is not a lot of research into what target blood sugar levels should be for women with gestational diabetes, and targets recommended to women vary globally. Target ranges advised by the Australasian Diabetes in Pregnancy Society are as follows:

- fasting capillary blood glucose levels <5.5 mmol/L
- 1 hour postprandial capillary blood glucose levels <8.0 mmol/L
- 2-hour postprandial blood glucose levels <6.7 mmol/L

Regular blood samples can be used to determine HbA1c levels, which give an idea of glucose control over a longer period.

Research suggests a possible benefit of breastfeeding to reduce the risk of diabetes and related risks for both mother and child.

=== Medication ===
If monitoring reveals failing control of glucose levels with these measures, or if there is evidence of complications like excessive fetal growth, treatment with insulin might be necessary. This is most commonly fast-acting insulin given just before eating to blunt glucose rises after meals. Care needs to be taken to avoid low blood sugar levels due to excessive insulin. Insulin therapy can be normal or very tight; more injections can result in better control but require more effort, and there is no consensus that it has large benefits. A 2016 Cochrane review (updated in 2023) concluded that quality evidence is not yet available to determine the best blood sugar range for improving health for pregnant women with GDM and their babies.

There is some evidence that certain medications by mouth might be safe in pregnancy, or at least, are less dangerous to the developing fetus than poorly controlled diabetes. When comparing which diabetes tablets (medication by mouth) work best and are safest, there is not enough quality research to support one medication over another. The medication metformin is better than glyburide. If blood glucose cannot be adequately controlled with a single agent, the combination of metformin and insulin may be better than insulin alone. Another review found good short term safety for both the mother and baby with metformin but unclear long term safety.

People may prefer metformin by mouth to insulin injections. Treatment of polyendocrine metabolic ovarian syndrome with metformin during pregnancy has been noted to decrease GDM levels.

Almost half of the women did not reach sufficient control with metformin alone and needed supplemental therapy with insulin; compared to those treated with insulin alone, they required less insulin, and they gained less weight. With no long-term studies into children of women treated with the drug, there remains a possibility of long-term complications from metformin therapy. Babies born to women treated with metformin have been found to develop less visceral fat, making them less prone to insulin resistance in later life.

Postpartum follow-up

After delivery, Most cases of gestational diabetes resolve; however, professional guidelines recommend that individuals undergo a 75-gram oral glucose tolerance test at six to twelve weeks postpartum to detect persistent glucose intolerance or type 2 diabetes. Long-term follow-up is also advised, as up to 50-60% of individuals with gestational diabetes develop type 2 diabetes later in life.

== Prognosis ==
Gestational diabetes generally resolves once the baby is born. Based on different studies, the chances of developing GDM in a second pregnancy, if a woman had GDM in her first pregnancy, are between 30 and 84%, depending on ethnic background. A second pregnancy within one year of the previous pregnancy has a large likelihood of GDM recurrence.

Women diagnosed with gestational diabetes have an increased risk of developing diabetes mellitus in the future. The risk is highest in women who need insulin treatment, had antibodies associated with diabetes (such as antibodies against glutamate decarboxylase, islet cell antibodies, or insulinoma antigen-2), have had more than two previous pregnancies, and women who were obese (in order of importance). Women requiring insulin to manage gestational diabetes have a 50% risk of developing diabetes within the next five years. Depending on the population studied, the diagnostic criteria and the length of follow-up, the risk can vary enormously. The risk appears to be highest in the first 5 years, reaching a plateau thereafter. One of the longest studies followed a group of women from Boston, Massachusetts; half of them developed diabetes after 6 years, and more than 70% had diabetes after 28 years. In a retrospective study in Navajo women, the risk of diabetes after GDM was estimated to be 50 to 70% after 11 years. Another study found a risk of diabetes after GDM of more than 25% after 15 years. In populations with a low risk for type 2 diabetes, in lean subjects and women with auto-antibodies, there is a higher rate of women developing type 1 diabetes (LADA).

Children of women with GDM have an increased risk for childhood and adult obesity and an increased risk of glucose intolerance and type 2 diabetes later in life. This risk relates to increased maternal glucose values. It is currently unclear how much genetic susceptibility and environmental factors contribute to this risk, and whether treatment of GDM can influence this outcome.

The relative benefits and harms of different oral anti-diabetic medications are not yet well understood as of 2017.

There are scarce statistical data on the risk of other conditions in women with GDM; in the Jerusalem Perinatal study, 410 out of 37,962 women were reported to have GDM, and there was a tendency towards more breast and pancreatic cancer, but more research is needed to confirm this finding.

Research is being conducted to develop a web-based clinical decision support system for GDM prediction using machine learning techniques. Results so far demonstrated great potential in clinical practicality for automatic GDM prognosis.

=== Complications ===
GDM poses a risk to the mother and child. This risk is largely related to uncontrolled blood glucose levels and their consequences. The risk increases with higher blood glucose levels. Treatment resulting in better control of these levels can reduce some of the risks of GDM considerably.

Having GDM can lead to mental health issues, with the distress added to the pregnancy. Women with gestational diabetes experienced increased anxiety, depression, and stress. Not only does it affect mental health during pregnancy, but it also leads to an increased risk of postpartum depression. The risk is over 4 times greater than a normal pregnancy. It was found that physical activity could decrease the risk of postpartum depression. It is a form of therapy that can help reduce the stress of these mental health issues.

The two main risks GDM imposes on the baby are growth abnormalities and chemical imbalances after birth, which may require admission to a neonatal intensive care unit. Infants born to mothers with GDM are at risk of being both large for gestational age (macrosomic) in unmanaged GDM, and small for gestational age and Intrauterine growth retardation in managed GDM. Macrosomia in turn increases the risk of instrumental deliveries (e.g., forceps, ventouse, and caesarean section) or problems during vaginal delivery (such as shoulder dystocia). Macrosomia may affect 12% of normal women compared to 20% of women with GDM. However, the evidence for each of these complications is not equally strong; in the Hyperglycemia and Adverse Pregnancy Outcome (HAPO) study for example, there was an increased risk for babies to be large but not small for gestational age in women with uncontrolled GDM. In a recent birth cohort study of 5150 deliveries, a research group active at the University of Helsinki and Helsinki University Hospital, Finland demonstrated that the mother's GDM is an independent factor that increases the risk of fetal hypoxia, during labour. The study was published in the Acta Diabetologica in June 2021. Another finding was that GDM increased the susceptibility of the fetus to intrapartum hypoxia, regardless of the size of the fetus. The risk of hypoxia and the resulting risk of poor condition in newborn infants was nearly 7-fold in the fetuses of mothers with GDM compared to the fetuses of non-diabetic mothers. Furthermore, according to the findings, the risk of needing to perform resuscitation on the newborn after birth was 10-fold.

Research into complications for GDM is difficult because of the many confounding factors (such as obesity). Labelling a woman as having GDM may in itself increase the risk of having an unnecessary caesarean section.

Neonates born to women with consistently high blood sugar levels are also at an increased risk of low blood glucose (hypoglycemia), jaundice, high red blood cell mass (polycythemia), and low blood calcium (hypocalcemia) and magnesium (hypomagnesemia). Untreated GDM also interferes with maturation, causing dysmature babies prone to respiratory distress syndrome due to incomplete lung maturation and impaired surfactant synthesis.

Unlike pre-gestational diabetes, gestational diabetes has not been clearly shown to be an independent risk factor for birth defects. Birth defects usually originate sometime during the first trimester (before the 13th week) of pregnancy, whereas GDM gradually develops and is least pronounced during the first and early second trimester. Studies have shown that the offspring of women with GDM are at a higher risk for congenital malformations. A large case-control study found that gestational diabetes was linked with a limited group of birth defects, and that this association was generally limited to women with a higher body mass index (≥ 25 kg/m^{2}). It is difficult to ensure this is not partially due to the inclusion of women with pre-existing type 2 diabetes who were not diagnosed before pregnancy.

Because of conflicting studies, it is unclear at the moment whether women with GDM have a higher risk of preeclampsia. In the HAPO study, the risk of preeclampsia was between 13% and 37% higher, although not all possible confounding factors were corrected.

== Epidemiology ==
The prevalence of GDM was 14.7%, 9.9%, and 14.4% in low-income countries (LIC), middle-income countries (MIC), and high-income countries (HIC) in 2021 by the International Association of Diabetes in Pregnancy Study Group's criteria. By 2021, the Global prevalence of hyperglycemia in pregnancy (HIP) as per the IDF atlas will be 21.1 million people, accounting for 16.7% of births to women aged 20-49. These individuals may experience some form of hyperglycemia during pregnancy; 80.3% of these were due to GDM.
