= Large for gestational age =

- Other names: Macrosomia
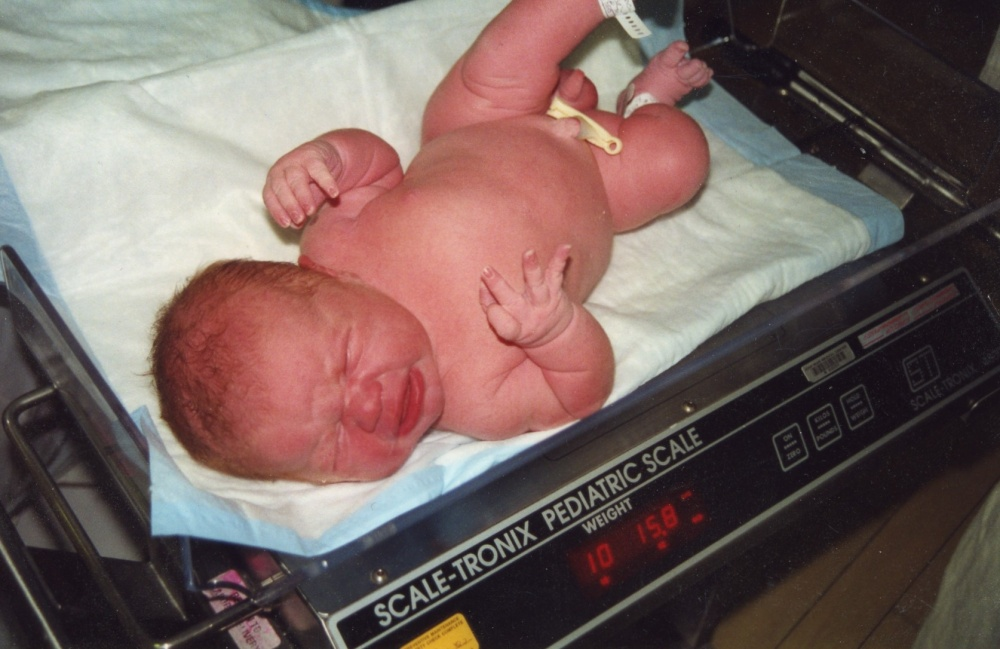
- LGA: A healthy 11-pound (5.0 kg) newborn child, delivered vaginally without complications (41 weeks; fourth child; no gestational diabetes)
- Specialty: Obstetrics, pediatrics

Large for gestational age (LGA) is a term used to describe infants that are born with an abnormally high weight, specifically in the 90th percentile or above, compared to other babies of the same developmental age. Macrosomia is a similar term that describes excessive birth weight, but refers to an absolute measurement, regardless of gestational age. Typically the threshold for diagnosing macrosomia is a body weight between 4,000 and 4,500 grams (8 lb 13 oz and 9 lb 15 oz), or more, measured at birth, but there are difficulties reaching a universal agreement of this definition.

Evaluating an infant for macrosomia or LGA can help identify risks associated with their birth, including labor complications of both the parent and the child, potential long-term health complications of the child, and infant mortality.

== Signs and symptoms ==
Fetal macrosomia and LGA often do not present with noticeable patient symptoms. Important signs include large fundal height (uterus size) and excessive amniotic fluid (polyhydramnios). Fundal height can be measured from the top of the uterus to the pubic bone and indicates that the newborn is likely large in volume. Excessive amniotic fluid indicates that the fetus's urine output is larger than expected, indicating a larger baby than normal; some symptoms of excessive amniotic fluid include

- shortness of breath
- swelling of lower extremities & abdominal wall
- uterine discomfort or contractions
- fetal malposition, such as breech presentation.

=== Complications ===
LGA or macrosomic births can lead to complications for both the mother and the infant.

==== Infant complications ====
Common risks in LGA babies include shoulder dystocia, low levels of blood sugar, brachial plexus injuries, metatarsus adductus, hip subluxation and talipes calcaneovalgus, due to intrauterine deformation.

Shoulder dystocia occurs when the infant's shoulder becomes impacted on the mother's pubic symphysis during birth. Newborns with shoulder dystocia are at risk of temporary or permanent nerve damage to the baby's arm, or other injuries such as fracture. Both increased birth weight and diabetes in the gestational parent are independent risk factors seen to increase risk of shoulder dystocia. In non-diabetic women, shoulder dystocia happens 0.65% of the time in babies that weigh less than 8 pounds 13 ounces (4,000 g), 6.7% of the time in babies that weigh 8 pounds (3,600 g) to 9 pounds 15 ounces (4,500 g), and 14.5% of the time in babies that weigh more than 9 pounds 15 ounces (4,500 g). In diabetic women, shoulder dystocia happens 2.2% of the time in babies that weigh less than 8 pounds 13 ounces (4,000 g), 13.9% of the time in babies that weigh 8 pounds (3,600 g) to 9 pounds 15 ounces (4,500 g), and 52.5% of the time in babies that weigh more than 9 pounds 15 ounces (4,500 g). Although larger babies are at higher risk for shoulder dystocia, most cases of shoulder dystocia happen in smaller babies because there are many more small and normal-size babies being born than large babies.

LGA babies are at higher risk of low blood sugar (hypoglycemia) in the neonatal period, independent of whether the mother has diabetes. Hypoglycemia, as well as hyperbilirubinemia and polycythemia, occurs as a result of hyperinsulinemia in the fetus.

High birth weight may also impact the baby in the long term, as studies have shown associations with increased risk of overweight, obesity, and type 2 diabetes mellitus. Studies have shown that the long-term overweight risk is doubled when the birth weight is greater than 4,000 g. The risk of type 2 diabetes mellitus as an adult is 19% higher in babies weighing more than 4,500 g at birth compared to those with birth weights between 4,000 g and 4,500 g.

==== Pregnant mother complications ====
Complications of the pregnant mother include: emergency cesarean section, postpartum hemorrhage, and obstetric anal sphincter injury. Compared to pregnancies without macrosomia, pregnant women giving birth to newborns weighing between 4,000 grams and 4,500 grams are at twice the risk of complications, and those giving birth to infants over 4,500 grams are at three times greater risk.

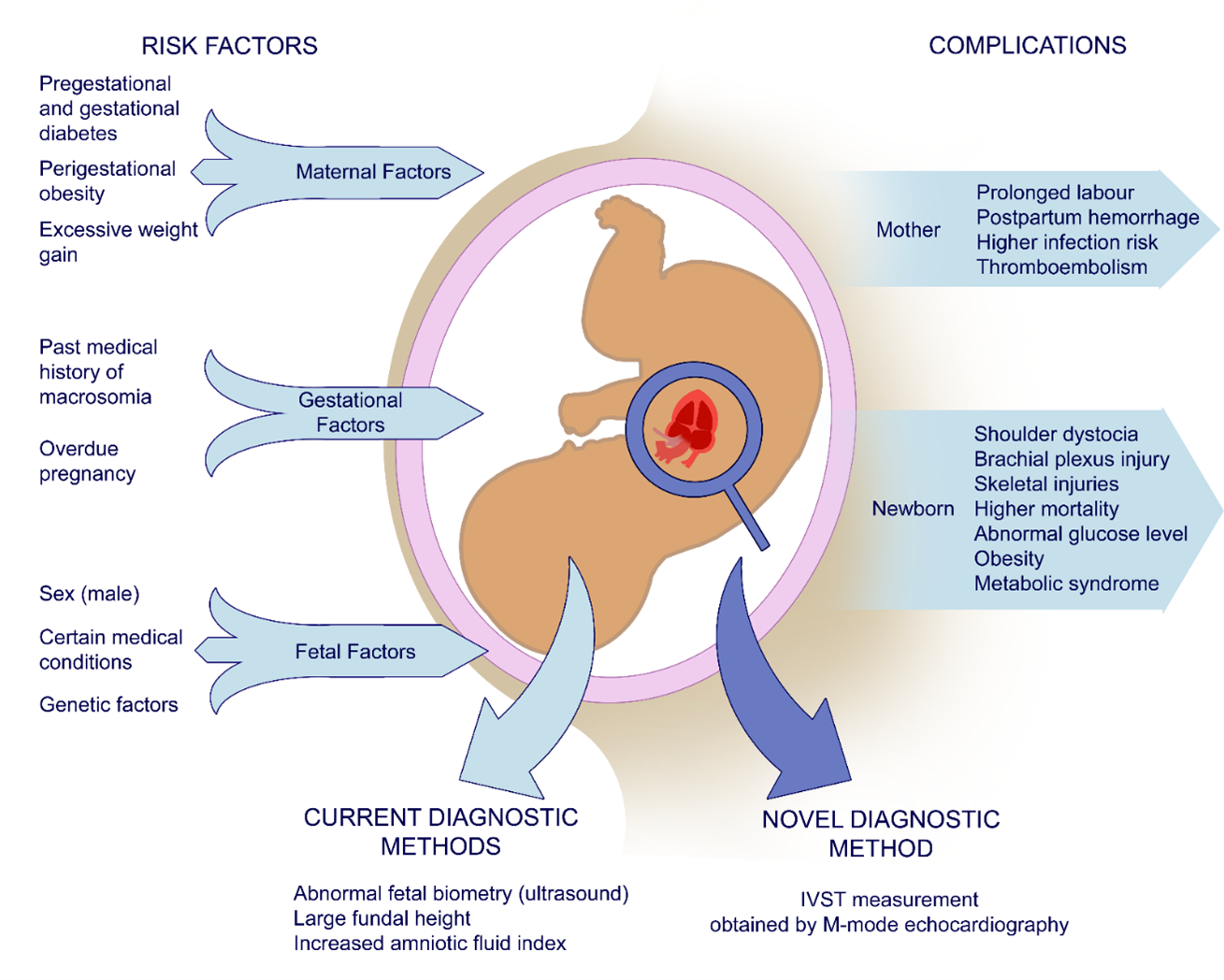
Schematic representation of macrosomia/LGA risk factors and related complications.

== Causes ==
Multiple factors have been shown to increase the likelihood of infant macrosomia, including preexisting obesity, diabetes, or dyslipidemia of the mother, gestational diabetes, post-term pregnancy, prior history of a macrosomic birth, genetics, and other factors.

=== Risk factors ===
==== Diabetes of the mother ====
One of the primary risk factors of LGA births and macrosomia is poorly-controlled maternal diabetes, particularly gestational diabetes (GD), as well as preexisting type 2 diabetes mellitus (DM). The risk of having a macrosomic fetus is three times greater in mothers with diabetes than those without diabetes.

==== Obesity in the mother ====
Obesity before pregnancy and maternal weight gain above recommended guidelines during pregnancy are other key risk factors for macrosomia or LGA infants. It has been demonstrated that while maternal obesity and gestational diabetes are independent risk factors for LGA and macrosomia, they can act synergistically, with even higher risk of macrosomia when both are present.

==== Genetics ====
Genetics can also play a role in having an LGA baby, and it is seen that taller, heavier parents tend to have larger babies. Genetic disorders of overgrowth (e.g. Beckwith–Wiedemann syndrome, Sotos syndrome, Perlman syndrome, Simpson-Golabi-Behmel syndrome) are often characterized by macrosomia.

==== Other risk factors ====
- Gestational age: pregnancies that go beyond 40 weeks increase the incidence of an LGA infant
- Fetal sex: male infants tend to weigh more than female infants
- Multiparity: giving birth to previous LGA infants vs. non-LGA infants
- Frozen embryo transfer as fertility treatment, as compared with fresh embryo transfer or no artificial assistance
- Maternal gut microbiome: A correlation has been identified between the maternal gut microbiome and macrosomia in recent research. The occurrence of macrosomia may be influenced by specific gut microbiota, including Bacteroides salyersiae, Bacteroides plebeius, Ruminococcus lactaris, and Bacteroides ovatus.

=== Mechanism ===
How each of these factors leads to excess fetal growth is complex and not completely understood.

Traditionally, the Pedersen hypothesis has been used to explain the mechanism by which uncontrolled gestational diabetes can lead to macrosomia, and many aspects of it have been confirmed with further studies. This explanation proposes that impaired glucose control in the mother leads to a hyperglycemic state for the fetus, which leads to a hyperinsulinemia response, in turn causing increased glucose metabolism, fat deposition, and excess growth.

It has also been shown that different patterns of excess fetal growth are seen in diabetic associated macrosomia compared to other predisposing factors, suggesting different underlying mechanisms. Specifically, macrosomic infants associated with glucose abnormalities are seen to have increased body fat, larger shoulders, and abdominal circumference.

== Maternal Lipid metabolism ==
During pregnancy, the levels of fat (lipids) in a mother's blood can influence how the baby grows. Studies have shown that higher levels of triglyceride and remnant cholesterol early in pregnancy are linked to faster fetal growth and a greater chance of the baby being born larger than average for its gestational age. Later in pregnancy, higher total cholesterol in the mother's blood has also been linked to higher birthweight, supporting the idea that maternal lipid levels can directly affect the baby's growth.

== Diagnosis ==
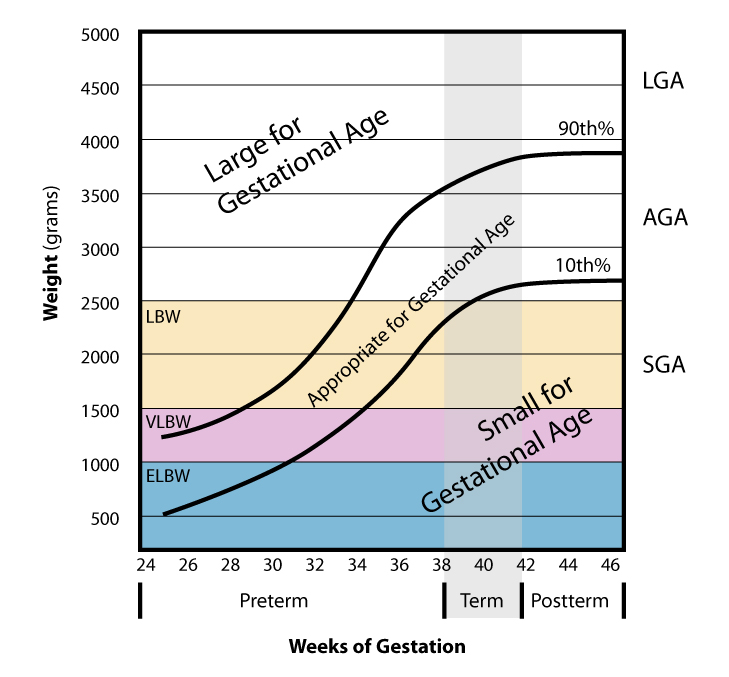

Diagnosing fetal macrosomia cannot be performed until after birth, as evaluating a baby's weight in the womb may be inaccurate. While ultrasound has been the primary method for diagnosing LGA, this form of fetal weight assessment remains imprecise, as the fetus is a highly variable structure in regards to density and weight— no matter the gestational age. Ultrasonography involves an algorithm that incorporates biometric measurements of the fetus, such as biparietal diameter (BPD), head circumference (HC), abdominal circumference (AC), and femur length (FL), to calculate the estimated fetal weight (EFW). Variability of fetal weight estimations has been linked to differences due to sensitivity and specificity of ultrasound algorithms as well as to the individual performing the ultrasound examination.

In addition to sonography, fetal weight can also be assessed using clinical and maternal methods. Clinical methods for estimating fetal weight involve measuring the mother's symphysis-fundal height and performing Leopold's maneuvers, which can help with determining the fetus's position in utero in addition to size. However, as this method relies heavily on practitioner experience and technique, it does not provide an accurate and definite diagnosis of an LGA infant and would only serve as a potential indication of suspected macrosomia. Fetal weight can also be estimated through a mother's subjective assessment of the fetus's size, but this method is dependent on a mother's experience with past pregnancies and may not be clinically useful. New methods are being studied for their accuracy in predicting fetal weight, such as measuring fetal soft tissue, but more research needs to be done to find a consistent, reliable method.

== Prevention ==
LGA and fetal macrosomia associated with poor glycemic control can be prevented by effective blood glucose management below a mean blood glucose level of 100 mg/dl before and during pregnancy; additionally, closely monitoring weight gain and diet during pregnancy can help to prevent LGA and fetal macrosomia. Women with obesity that undergo weight loss can greatly decrease their chances of having a macrosomic or LGA infant. Additionally, regular prenatal care and routine check-ups with one's physician are important in planning pregnancy, especially if one has obesity, diabetes, hypertension, or other conditions before conception.

A study done in Spain with over 500 pregnant healthy participants were tested to see whether or not regular moderate intensity exercise helped reduce the risk of gestational diabetes mellitus GDM. In conclusion although exercise does help reduce some of the risk factors associated with GDM it does not completely prevent it. The study also concluded that regular moderate intensity training does help decreasing the risk of maternal weight gain, c-sections and macrosomia.

== Screening ==
Most screening for LGA and macrosomia occurs during prenatal check-ups, where both fundal height and ultrasound scans can give an approximate measurement of the baby's proportions. Two-dimensional ultrasound can be used to screen for macrosomia and LGA but estimations are generally not precise at any gestational age until birth.

== Management ==
An approach that is sometimes suggested is to induce labor close to the estimated due date (at term) or near that date. The rationale is that by the baby being born with a lower birth weight, there would be a lower risk of long labors, cesarean section, bone fractures, and shoulder dystocia. However, this method could increase the number of women with perineal tears, and failed inductions can prompt the need for emergency cesarean sections. There is no strong evidence that an induced birth increases the risk of the person requiring a cesarean section. Another consideration is that since there may be inaccuracies in estimating or predicting the neonate's weight in utero, there is a risk of inducing labor unnecessarily. Doctors disagree whether women should be induced for suspected macrosomia, and more research is needed to find out what is best for women and their babies.

Elective cesarean section has also been presented as a potential delivery method for infants of suspected macrosomia, as it can serve to prevent possible birth trauma. However, the American College of Obstetricians and Gynecologists recommends that cesarean delivery should only be considered if the fetus is an estimated weight of at least 5,000 grams in non-diabetic mothers and at least 4,500 grams in diabetic mothers. A number needed to treat analysis determined that approximately 3,700 women with suspected fetal macrosomia would have to undergo an unnecessary cesarean section to prevent one incident of brachial plexus injuries secondary to shoulder dystocia.

Management of gestational diabetes through dietary modifications and anti-diabetic medications has been shown to decrease the incidence of LGA. The use of metformin to control maternal blood glucose levels has shown to be more effective than using insulin alone in reducing the likelihood of fetal macrosomia. There is a 20% lower chance of having an LGA baby when using metformin to manage diabetes compared to using insulin.

Modifiable risk factors that increase the incidence of LGA births, such as gestational weight gain above recommended BMI guidelines, can be managed with lifestyle modifications, including maintaining a balanced diet and exercising. Such interventions can help mothers achieve the recommended gestational weight and lower the incidence of fetal macrosomia in obese and overweight women. The World Health Organization also recommends that mothers aim for their recommended BMI prior to conception. In general, obese mothers or women with excessive gestational weight gain may have higher risk of pregnancy complications (ranging from LGA, shoulder dystocia, etc.).

== Epidemiology ==
In healthy pregnancies without pre-term or post-term health complications, fetal macrosomia has been observed to affect around 12% of newborns. By comparison, women with gestational diabetes are at an increased risk of giving birth to LGA babies, where ~15-45% of neonates may be affected. In 2017, the National Center of Health Statistics found that 7.8% of live-born infants born in the United States meet the definition of macrosomia, where their birth weight surpasses the threshold of 4000 grams (about 8.8 pounds). Women in Europe and the United States tend to have higher pre-term body weight and have increased gestational weight during pregnancy compared to women in east Asia. Thus, women in Europe and the United States, with higher gestational weight gain, tend to have higher associated risk of LGA infants, macrosomia and cesarean. In European countries, the prevalence of births of newborns weighing between 4,000 g and 4,499 g is 8% to 21%, and in Asian countries the prevalence is between 1% and 8%. In general, rates of LGA infants have increased 15-25% in many countries including the United States, Canada, Germany, Denmark, Scotland and more in the past 20–30 years, suggesting an increase in LGA births worldwide.
