= Receiving blanket =

Blanket for swaddling newborn babies

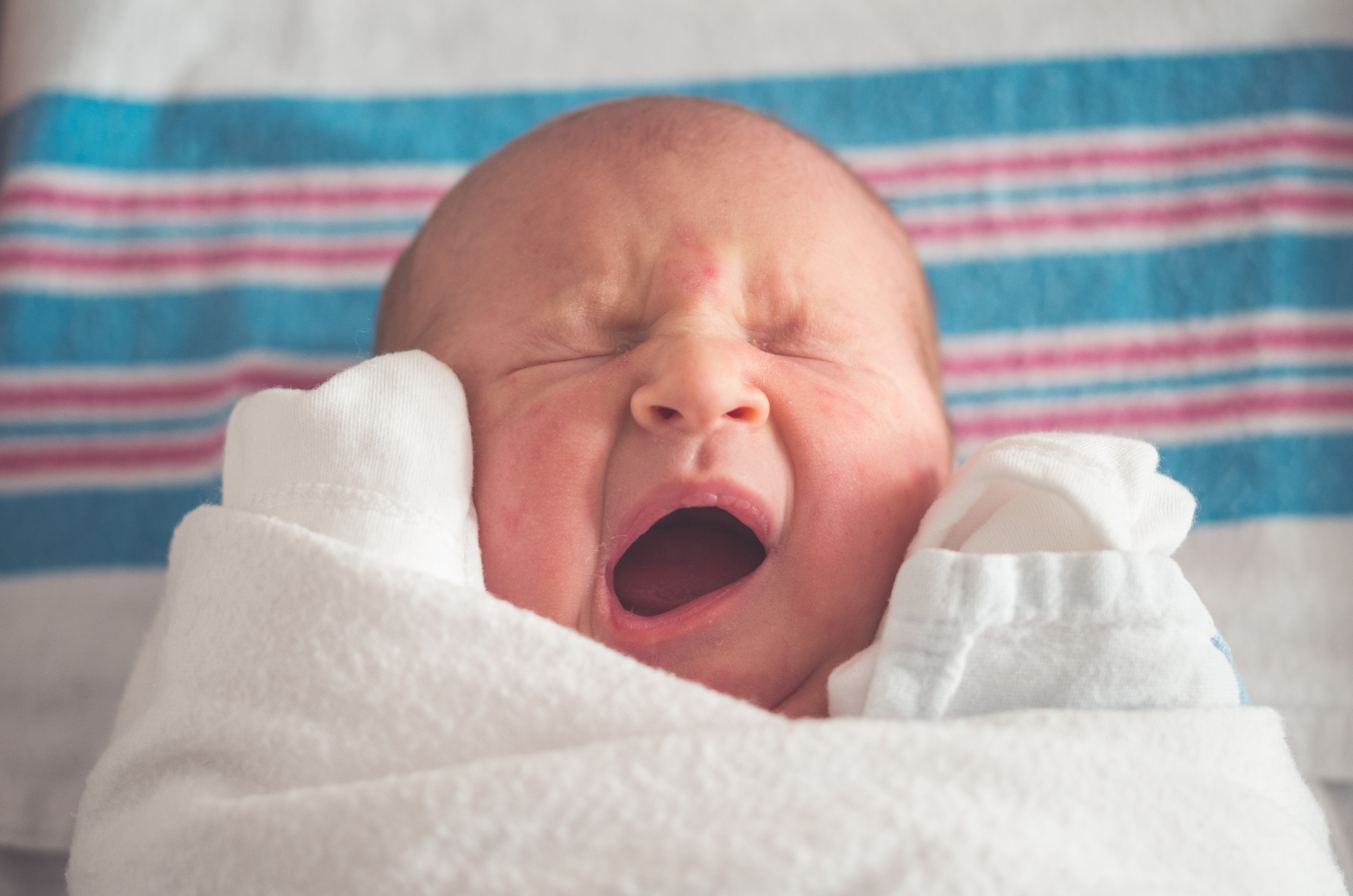
A swaddled infant rests on a standard hospital receiving blanket

A receiving blanket is a small, lightweight blanket used to wrap or swaddle newborns, as well as in infant care more generally.

In the United States, many hospitals use a standard white cotton flannel receiving blanket, patterned with pink and blue stripes, manufactured by Medline Industries. Handmade receiving blankets, sometimes given as gifts to a new or expectant parent, may feature colorful prints and be embellished with ruffles or decorative stitches.

Hospitals use receiving blankets for a variety of applications. Some neonatal intensive care units use receiving blankets to cover incubators, in order to reduce light and improve infant rest. The use of receiving blankets during kangaroo care of preterm infants is recommended in order to maintain the infant's body heat.

Parents may use a receiving blanket to cover a sleeping infant, or place a blanket beneath the infant to create a soft sleeping surface. Some mothers cover their infants with receiving blankets while breastfeeding, feeling that it provides modesty and discretion. Receiving blankets are often recommended for miscellaneous purposes in infant care, such as propping up an infant or as a place for a sponge bath.
