= Gestational weight gain =

Increase in body weight during pregnancy

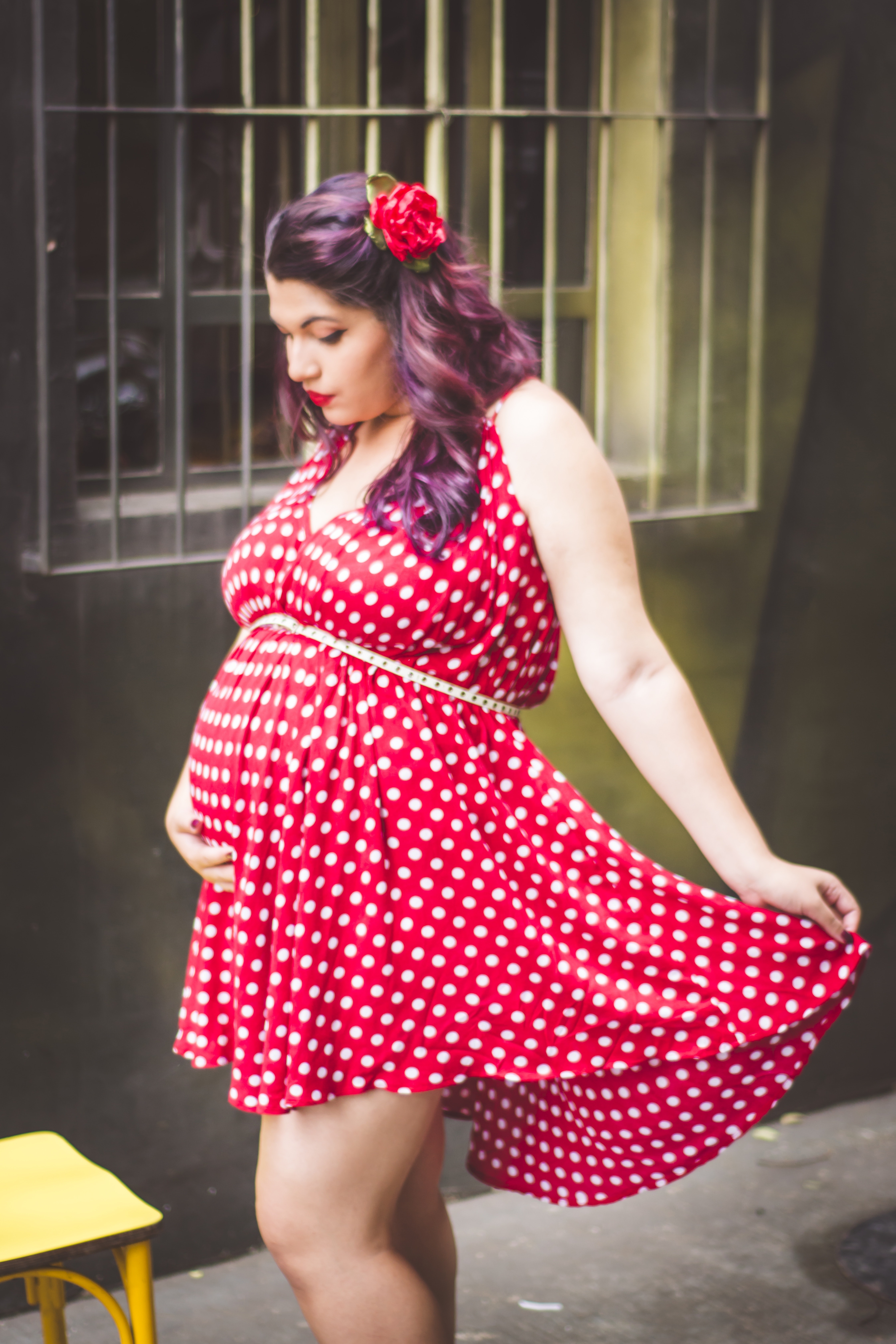

Gestational weight gain is defined as the amount of weight gain a woman experiences between conception and the birth of an infant.

== Recommendations ==
The Institute of Medicine (IOM) recommendations for gestational weight gain are based on the body mass index (BMI) of women before pregnancy. However, early first-trimester BMI appears to be a valid proxy for pre-conception BMI. BMI is split up into four categories: underweight (<18.5 kg/m^2), normal weight (18.5-24.9 kg/m^2), overweight (25-29.9 kg/m^2), and obese (≥30.0 kg/m^2). The IOM has recommended the ranges of total weight gain to be 12.5–18 kg, 11.5–16 kg, 7-11.5 kg, and 5–9 kg, respectively. That is, the smaller the BMI pre-pregnancy, the more weight a woman is expected to gain during her pregnancy. Based on these recommendations, gestational weight gain is categorized as inadequate (less than recommended), adequate (within the recommendation), and excessive (exceeding the recommendation). It is also important to note that the IOM recommendations stated above are for singleton pregnancies.

== Contributing factors ==
Excessive GWG has been shown to adversely affect maternal and baby health postpartum. Only a little over a quarter of women have adequate GWG, meaning that their weight gain during pregnancy falls within the IOM recommended range. A little less than a quarter of women have inadequate GWG. However, excessive GWG is the most prevalent occurring in around half of pregnant women.

=== Pre-pregnancy BMI ===
Having a higher BMI pre-pregnancy may leave one at a greater risk for excessive gestational weight gain and ultimately for cardio-metabolic diseases prenatally and postpartum.

=== Food access ===
Food security is defined as consistent access, geographically or financially, to sufficient, nutritious, and affordable food and has been theorized to be a cause of excess gestational weight gain. Women who only have access to fast food, for example, would be considered to be "lower food security", and these women might be more likely to suffer from excess gestational weight gain because the food available is cheap but high in calories. Having access to affordable and nutritious food has been linked to a lesser risk of impaired glucose tolerance. which is related to excess gestational weight gain.

It is not uncommon for there to be a correlation between socioeconomic status and food security; that is, women of low socioeconomic status have been reported to have low food security, particularly in terms of the affordability of nutritious food. Some women of low socioeconomic status claim that they feel pressure to eat more during pregnancy out of the fear that they are not providing their babies with enough food. With low food security, these women would consume high calorie food in significant quantities, potentially leading to excess gestational weight gain. There seems to be a negative correlation between food security and excess gestational weight gain that is sometimes related to socioeconomic status.

=== Expectations ===
Overweight and obese women are significantly more likely to expect excessive gestational weight gain compared with normal-weight women, and women who report expecting to gain excessively are three times more likely to actually gain excessively than those who expect to gain within the guidelines.

=== Income ===
Regardless of a relation to food security, having a low income might also predispose women to excess gestational weight gain, yet the reasoning is unclear. One possibility is related to stress. Financial stress is positively correlated with levels of CRP postpartum, a stress hormone associated with weight gain, most likely because people eat increasingly unhealthy foods when stressed. Women with a higher monthly budget for food may have a healthier gestational weight gain, while those with less money allocated for food may be more likely to experience excessive gestational weight gain. However, the opposite may also be true: wealthier women may be more likely to suffer from excess gestational weight gain. Women in wealthy communities have been reported to have higher postpartum weight retention than those in more poverty, and since women who have excessive gestational weight gain are more likely to retain weight postpartum women in less poverty might be more likely to have excess gestational weight gain. This suggests that a greater household income does not necessarily provide protection against excess gestational weight gain.

=== Race/ethnicity ===
Race/ethnicity is an important variable to take into account when discussing gestational weight gain because women of racial/ethnic minorities demonstrate disproportionately higher obesity levels than non-Hispanic white women. The IOM guidelines were created from data mostly consisting of white women, and thus may not be an appropriate measure for women of other races/ethnicities.

African American women in general may have higher postpartum cardio-metabolic risk and more excess gestational weight gain than Latina women, who in turn have more than white women. However, this is not always the case. One study reported that although African American women are more likely to be overweight or obese pre-pregnancy, they were less likely to have excessive weight gain than white women in one study.

=== Poverty ===
Even though in many areas in the United States, there has been a decline in inequality based on race/ethnicity, there still exists disproportionate social stratification. Racial/ethnic minorities, such as blacks and Latinos, are more likely to be found in neighborhoods high in poverty. African American women in poverty have been seen to have significantly higher postpartum cardio-metabolic risk than wealthier African American women, which could be partially related to these impoverished women having excess gestational weight gain. White women in poverty, on the other hand, had excess gestational weight gain and higher postpartum cardio-metabolic risk than the white women with higher incomes. This was also true for Latina women in poverty compared to those wealthier. The information regarding how race/ethnicity affects the experience of excess gestational weight gain can be related to poverty levels, and the data available is limited and variable.
