= Balloon tamponade =

- Scheme of using the Blakemore tube. There are sphygmomanometer drains connected with esophageal port, to enable inflating the balloon with correct pressure.
- ICD-9-CM: 96.06

Balloon tamponade is the use of balloons inserted into the esophagus, stomach or uterus, and inflated to alleviate or stop refractory bleeding.

== Esophagus or stomach ==
Examples include:

- Sengstaken–Blakemore tube, with three lumens (two balloons and a gastric aspiration port). Pressure can be applied to gastric and esophageal varices by balloon inflation and traction.
- Linton tube, with a large gastric balloon, and gastric and esophageal aspirates
- Minnesota four-lumen tube, with esophageal and gastric balloons, and esophageal and gastric aspirates.

Balloon tamponade is considered a bridge to more definitive treatment modalities, and is usually administered in the emergency department or in the intensive-care unit setting, due to the illness of patients and the complications of the procedure.

== Uterus ==
In the uterus, balloon tamponade can alleviate or stop postpartum hemorrhage (PPH). Inflating a Sengstaken–Blakemore tube in the uterus successfully treats atonic postpartum hemorrhage refractory to medical management in approximately 80% of cases. Such procedure is relatively simple, inexpensive and has low surgical morbidity. A Bakri balloon is a balloon tamponade specifically constructed for uterine postpartum hemorrhage.

The Bakri balloon tamponade (BBT), designed for postpartum hemorrhage, is an effective life-saving balloon. A recent study involving 50 cases was carried out by the department of Obstetrics and Gynecology at University Central Hospital in Helsinki, Finland. With an overall success rate of 86%, the authors concluded that the Bakri balloon tamponade is "a simple, readily available, effective and safe procedure" in the management of postpartum hemorrhage. The research also indicates that BBT is able to provide practitioners with "time for other interventions or transportation from local hospital to tertiary centre". The authors of the study recommend BBT be included in the PPH protocol.

An alternative to the Bakri is the BT-Cath (balloon-tamponade catheter) which has an easy-fill system allowing single person inflation and saving time in the theatre setting. The BT-Cath is more pear-shaped and contours to the uterus more easily than the Bakri.

A low-cost alternative is a condom balloon tamponade, a form of intrauterine tamponade, created from a catheter, a male latex condom, and a string to tie the condom to the catheter. The method was developed in Bangladesh in 2001 by Sayeba Akhter and has since been supported by health workers worldwide as an effective method to stop postpartum hemorrhage, particularly in low-resource settings.

== See also ==
- Resuscitative endovascular balloon occlusion of the aorta
