= Fundal massage =

Medical procedure used to treat uterine atony

- Other names: Uterine massage
- Specialty: Ob/gyn

Fundal massage, also called uterine massage, is a technique used to reduce bleeding and cramping of the uterus after childbirth or after an abortion. As the uterus returns to its nonpregnant size, its muscles contract strongly, which can cause pain. Fundal massage can be performed with one hand over the pubic bone, firmly massaging the uterine fundus (the top of the uterus), or with the addition of one hand in the vagina compressing the two uterine arteries. Routine use of fundal massage can prevent postpartum or post-abortion hemorrhage and can reduce pain; it may also reduce the need for uterotonics, medications that cause the uterus to contract. It is used to treat uterine atony, a condition where the uterus lacks muscle tone and is soft to the touch instead of firm.

== See also ==
- Pelvic massage
