= Non-pneumatic anti-shock garment =

Device used to treat hypovolemic shock

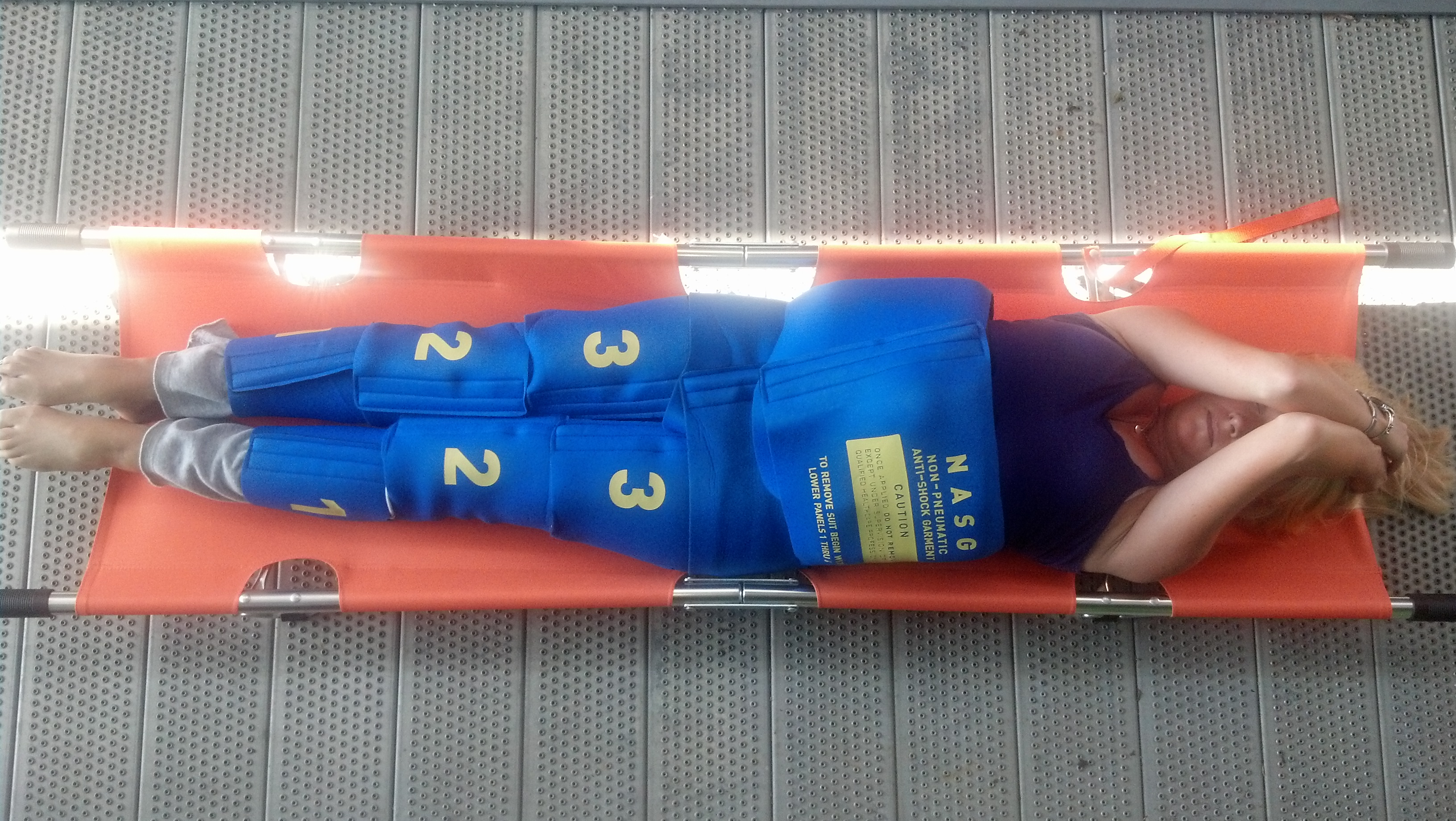
- A woman demonstrating application of a non-pneumatic anti-shock garment
- Specialty: Emergency medicine

The non-pneumatic anti-shock garment (NASG) is a low-technology first-aid device used to treat hypovolemic shock. Its efficacy for reducing maternal deaths due to obstetrical hemorrhage is being researched. Obstetrical hemorrhage is heavy bleeding of a woman during or shortly after a pregnancy. Current estimates suggest over 300,000 women die from obstetrical hemorrhage every year with 99% of cases occurring in developing countries; many of these deaths are preventable. Many women in resource-poor settings deliver far from health-care facilities. Once hemorrhage has been identified, many women die before reaching or receiving adequate treatment. The NASG can be used to keep women alive until they can get the treatment they need.

== Background ==
Every year, an estimated 342,900 women die from complications of pregnancy and childbirth, 99% of these deaths occur in developing countries. Worldwide, for every 100,000 live births, about 251 women die. In some industrialized countries such as the U.S., this is 13 deaths for every 100,000 live babies born with American women having a lifetime risk of 1 in 2,100 of dying from childbirth related complications. However, in some countries, such as Afghanistan up to 1,600 women die for every 100,000 live births and women have a 1 in 11 lifetime risk of maternal death.

For every woman who dies, there are 30 women who suffer a disability as a result of pregnancy or childbirth related complications (a maternal morbidity) and 10 who experience a 'near miss mortality' (a life-threatening obstetric complication). Morbidities can be serious, lifelong ailments which compromise a woman's health, productivity, quality of life, family health and ability to participate in community life. If a mother dies after childbirth, the newborn is ten times more likely to die before the age of two, other children are more likely to suffer from decreased nutrition and decreased schooling. Many motherless families find it difficult to survive, often with older children having to drop out of school in order to work to help support the family or being sent to live with a relative’s intact family. In addition to this, maternal and newborn deaths are estimated to cost the world $15 billion in lost productivity annually, with maternal health proven to support a country's economic growth and cut poverty. Maternal death and disability is a human rights issue. It also means hardships and loss of productivity for families, communities and nations. This is of such great concern that in 2000, world leaders decided that improving maternal health should be one of the 8 Millennium Development Goals for the international community.

The leading cause of maternal mortality (deaths from pregnancy and childbirth related complications) is obstetric hemorrhage in which a woman bleeds heavily, most often immediately after giving birth. A woman dies every 4 minutes from this kind of complication. A woman can bleed to death in two hours or less, and in rural areas, where hospitals may be days away, this leaves little hope for women suffering from hemorrhage. Also, in areas that have limited resources, clinics and hospitals might not have the staff or supplies needed to save a woman's life. Women die waiting for treatment.

There are some emerging technologies which are currently being researched and implemented that seek to prevent these unnecessary deaths. One of these is the NASG which is a low-technology first-aid device that can be placed around the lower body of a woman who has gone into shock from obstetric bleeding. This garment decreases blood loss, recovers women from shock and keeps them alive while they are traveling to a hospital or awaiting treatment.

== History ==
In the 1900s an inflatable pressure suit was developed by George Crile. It was used to maintain blood pressure during surgery. In the 1940s and after undergoing numerous modifications, the suit was refined for use as an anti-gravity suit (G-suit). Further modification led to its use in the Vietnam War for resuscitating and stabilizing soldiers with traumatic injuries before and during transportation. In the 1970s the G-suit was modified into a half-suit which became known as MAST (Military anti-shock trousers) or PASG (Pneumatic Anti-Shock Garment). During the 1980s the PASG garment became used more and more by emergency rescue services to stabilize patients with shock due to lower body hemorrhage. During the 1990s the PASG was added to the American College of Obstetrics and Gynecology, making it part of the recommended treatment for use by obstetricians and gynecologists in the USA. However, it was removed from the guidelines later and is no longer on the ACOG guidelines.

From the 1970s, NASA/Ames was involved in developing a non-pneumatic version of the anti-shock garment. This was originally used for hemophiliac children, but has since been developed into the garment known as the Non-pneumatic Anti-Shock Garment (NASG).

The non-pneumatic anti-shock garment is now off-patent and produced in several different locations.

The use of the garment for obstetrical hemorrhage in low-resource settings began in 2002 when Dr. Carol Brees and Dr. Paul Hensleigh introduced the garment into a hospital in Pakistan and reported on a case series of its use.

== How it works ==
The non-pneumatic anti-shock garment is a simple neoprene and Velcro device that looks like the bottom half of a wetsuit cut into segments. It can be used to treat shock, resuscitate, stabilize and prevent further bleeding in women with obstetric hemorrhage.

When in shock, the brain, heart and lungs are deprived of oxygen because blood accumulates in the lower abdomen and legs. The NASG reverses shock by returning blood to the heart, lungs and brain. This restores the woman's consciousness, pulse and blood pressure. Additionally, the NASG decreases bleeding from the parts of the body compressed under it.

Mechanisms of action are based upon laws of physics. Recent research has identified that the pressure applied by the NASG serves to significantly increase the resistive index of the internal iliac artery (which is responsible for supplying the majority of blood flow to the uterus via the uterine arteries). Another recent study has shown the NASG to decrease blood flow in the distal aorta.

After a simple training session, anyone can put the garment on a bleeding woman. Once her bleeding is controlled, she can be safely transported to a referral hospital for emergency obstetrical care.

The non-pneumatic anti-shock garment is light, flexible and comfortable for the wearer. It has been designed to allow perineal access so that examinations and vaginal procedures can be performed without it being removed. Upon application a patient's vital signs are often quickly restored and consciousness regained. It is extremely important not to remove the NASG before a woman receives IV fluids, blood and before all vital signs are restored. Early removal can be dangerous and even fatal.

== Research and implementation ==
In Egypt and Nigeria, in separate and combined analyses, findings showed that women treated with the NASG fared much better than women who were not treated with the NASG. Results showed significant reductions in blood loss, rate of emergency hysterectomy and incidence of morbidity and mortality. Analyses examining the use of the NASG on cases of uterine atony, postpartum hemorrhage, and non-atonic etiologies (ante and postpartum) found similar results. Other analyses found that the NASG additionally resulted in a more rapid recovery from shock, helped women overcome treatment delays and had a similarly strong ameliorative effect on women in severe shock.

A combined analysis on 1442 women recently published, examined the effect of the NASG on women with obstetric hemorrhage. Despite being in a worse condition at study entry, negative outcomes were significantly reduced in the NASG phase: mean measured blood loss decreased from 444 mL to 240 mL (p<0.001), maternal mortality decreased from 6.3% to 3.5% (RR 0.56, 95% CI 0.35–0.89), severe morbidities from 3.7% to 0.7% (RR 0.20, 95% CI 0.08–0.50), and emergency hysterectomy from 8.9% to 4.0% (RR 0.44, 0.23–0.86). In multiple logistic regression, there was a 55% reduced odds of mortality during the NASG phase (aOR 0.45, 0.27–0.77). The number needed to treat (NNT) to prevent either mortality or severe morbidity was 18 (12–36).

Qualitative research in Mexico and Nigeria has examined acceptance of the NASG and found that overall, there were positive reactions to the garment as a relevant technology for saving women's lives.

Research is currently ongoing in Zambia and Zimbabwe to investigate whether the NASG is more successful if implemented at primary health care facilities where hemorrhage is first identified.

In 2012, the World Health Organization included the NASG in its recommendations for the treatment of postpartum hemorrhage.
