= Sayeba Akhter =

Bangladeshi physician

Sayeba Akther
- সায়েবা আক্তার
- Born: 1953 (age 72–73)
- Education: Chittagong Medical College
- Known for: Obstetrics and Gynaecology
- Awards: Ekushey Padak (2020); Anannya Top Ten Awards; Mother Teresa Awards
- Scientific career
- Workplaces: Dhaka Medical College and Hospital

Sayeba Akhter (born 1953) is a Bangladeshi physician who has dedicated her career to eliminating obstetric fistula. She is an executive member of the International Society of Obstetric Fistula Surgeons and a former president of the Obstetrics and Gynaecology Society of Bangladesh. She leads two charities, in Dhaka and Gaibandha, which focus on the education of underprivileged girls.

In recognition of her contribution in medicine, the government of Bangladesh awarded her the country's second highest civilian award Ekushey Padak in 2020.

== Early life and education ==
Akhter was born to M. A. Malek and Mahmuda Khatun in Chittagong. She has said that she was inspired to help young mothers by the devotion of the doctors she met during her medical training. Akhter earned her medical degree at Chittagong Medical College.

== Research and career ==
She served as head of the Obstetrics and Gynaecology Department at Dhaka Medical College and Hospital. In 2000, Akhter created a low-cost uterine balloon tamponade (UBT) from a catheter and a condom. At the time she created the UBT, around 40% of maternal deaths in Bangladesh occurred due to postpartum haemorrhage. She created the UBT, costing less than $5, to prevent bleeding after childbirth. Her device has made a considerable impact on women's health worldwide, saving mothers from suffering postpartum bleeding. The approach became known as Saeyba's Method, and has been taught to doctors and midwives in developing countries.

Obstetric fistula is common in Bangladesh because of the number of child brides who are not physically prepared for childbirth. Alongside being physically unprepared, young women suffer from social stigma when asking for help, and there is a shortage of doctors trained to handle the condition. In 2005 Akhter opened a national centre at the Dhaka Medical College and Hospital where she trained doctors to repair fistula. She established the centre in collaboration with the United Nations Population Fund Campaign to End Fistula after studying the Addis Ababa Fistula Hospital in Ethiopia. The programme started with one month of training and was funded by the Islamic Development Bank. Between 2005 and 2011 the centre treated almost four hundred patients, and taught the patients income generating activities so that they could become more independent once they left hospital. In 2009, she was fired from Bangabandhu Sheikh Mujib Medical University. MAMM's Institute of Fistula and Women's Health (MIFWOH), was formally established by Akhter in 2012.

In 2008 she was elected president of the Obstetrics and Gynaecology Society of Bangladesh. She has been involved with the International Federation of Gynaecology and Obstetrics (FIGO) since then, serving on the Committee for Genital Trauma. Together they developed the Fistula Surgery Training Initiative and FIGO Global Competency-Based Fistula Surgery Training Manual. A shortage of specialist surgeons means that only one in every fifty women has access to a trained surgeon. Alongside increasing the capacity of Bangladesh's doctors and surgeons, Akhter has worked with the government of Bangladesh on reducing the prevalence of obstetric fistula in Bangladesh. In 2017 the government of Bangladesh raised the legal age of marriage, meaning that women had to be over eighteen. In 2019 it was announced that Akhter and FIGO had trained over 50 surgeons who had provided over 7,500 repair operations in Africa and Asia.

Recently Akhter has worked with Rohingya people who have fled from Myanmar to Bangladesh. Rohingya women and girls have limited access to hygiene, family planning and maternal health. She currently serves as an obstetrics specialist and surgeon at Popular Diagnostic Center, Dhanmondi.

=== Awards and honours ===
Akhter has won several awards and honours, including the Anannya Top Ten Awards, Women Super Achiever Award, Mother Teresa Awards and Lifetime Achievement Award. She holds an honorary Fellowship of the Royal College of Obstetricians and Gynaecologists, the Indian College of Maternal and Child Health, the College of Physicians and Surgeons Pakistan and the Indian Academy of Obstetrics & Gynaecology. The government of Bangladesh awarded her the country's second highest civilian award Ekushey Padak in 2020.
