= Maternal death =

Aspect of human reproduction and medicine

- Other names: Maternal mortality
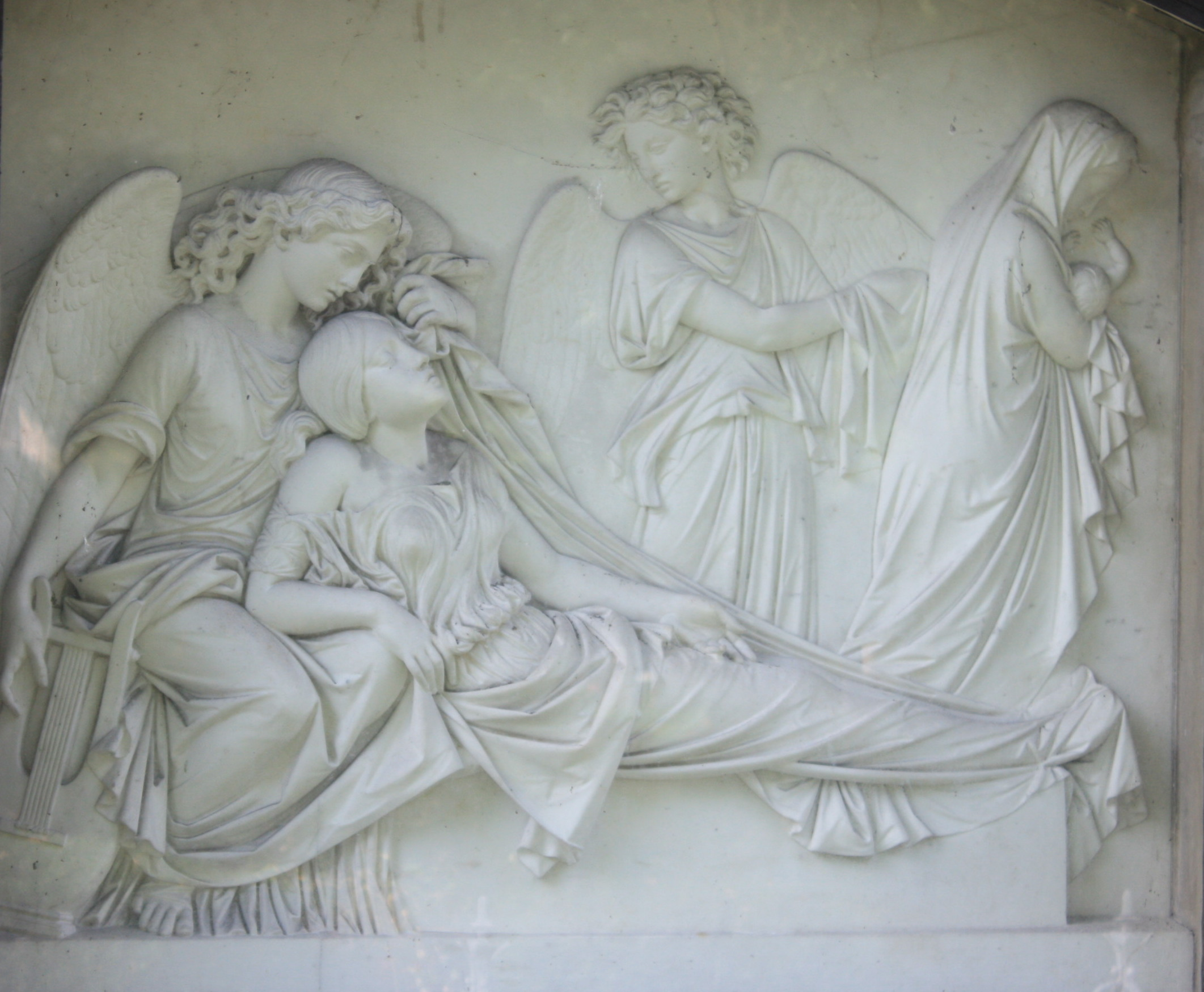
- A mother dies and is taken by angels as her new child is taken away, a grave from 1863 in Striesener Friedhof in Dresden.
- Specialty: Obstetrics

Maternal death or maternal mortality is defined in slightly different ways by several different health organizations. The World Health Organization (WHO) defines maternal death as the death of a pregnant mother due to complications related to pregnancy, underlying conditions worsened by the pregnancy or management of these conditions. This can occur either while she is pregnant or within six weeks of resolution of the pregnancy. The CDC definition of pregnancy-related deaths extends the period of consideration to include one year from the resolution of the pregnancy. Pregnancy associated death, as defined by the American College of Obstetricians and Gynecologists (ACOG), are all deaths occurring within one year of a pregnancy resolution. Identification of pregnancy associated deaths is important for deciding whether or not the pregnancy was a direct or indirect contributing cause of the death.

There are two main measures used when talking about the rates of maternal mortality in a community or country. These are the maternal mortality ratio and maternal mortality rate, both abbreviated as "MMR". By 2017, the world maternal mortality rate had declined 44% since 1990; however, every day 808 women die from pregnancy or childbirth related causes. According to the United Nations Population Fund (UNFPA) 2017 report, about every 2 minutes a woman dies because of complications due to childbirth or pregnancy. For every woman who dies, there are about 20 to 30 women who experience injury, infection, or other birth or pregnancy-related complications.

UNFPA estimated that 303,000 women died of pregnancy or childbirth-related causes in 2015. The WHO divides causes of maternal deaths into two categories: direct obstetric deaths and indirect obstetric deaths. Direct obstetric deaths are causes of death due to complications of pregnancy, birth or termination. For example, these could range from severe bleeding to obstructed labor, for which there are highly effective interventions. Indirect obstetric deaths are caused by pregnancy interfering or worsening an existing condition, like a heart problem.

As women have gained access to family planning and skilled birth attendant with backup emergency obstetric care, the global maternal mortality ratio has fallen from 385 maternal deaths per 100,000 live births in 1990 to 216 deaths per 100,000 live births in 2015. Many countries halved their maternal death rates in the last 10 years. Although attempts have been made to reduce maternal mortality, there is much room for improvement, particularly in low-resource regions. Over 85% of maternal deaths are in low-resource communities in Africa and Asia. In higher resource regions, there are still significant areas with room for growth, particularly as they relate to racial and ethnic disparities and inequities in maternal mortality and morbidity rates.

Overall, maternal mortality is an important marker of the health of the country and reflects on its health infrastructure. Lowering the amount of maternal death is an important goal of many health organizations worldwide.

== Causes ==
lifetime risk of maternal death

=== Direct obstetric deaths ===
==== Overview ====
Direct obstetric deaths are due to complications of pregnancy, birth, termination, or complications arising from their management.

The causes of maternal death vary by region and level of access. According to a study published in the Lancet which covered the period from 1990 to 2013, the most common causes of maternal death world-wide are postpartum bleeding (15%), complications from unsafe abortion (15%), hypertensive disorders of pregnancy (10%), postpartum infections (8%), and obstructed labor (6%). Other causes include blood clots (3%) and pre-existing conditions (28%).

==== Descriptions by condition ====
Postpartum bleeding happens when there is uncontrollable bleeding from the uterus, cervix, or vaginal wall after birth. This can happen when the uterus does not contract correctly after birth, there is leftover placenta in the uterus, or there are cuts in the cervix or vagina from birth.

Hypertensive disorders of pregnancy happen when the body does not regulate blood pressure correctly. In pregnancy, this is due to changes at the level of the blood vessels, likely because of the placenta. This includes medical conditions like gestational hypertension and pre-eclampsia.

Postpartum infections are infections of the uterus or other parts of the reproductive tract after the resolution of a pregnancy. They are usually bacterial and cause fever, increased pain, and foul-smelling discharge.

Obstructed labor happens when the baby does not properly move into the pelvis and out of the body during labor. The most common cause of obstructed labor is when the baby's head is too big or angled in a way that does not allow it to pass through the pelvis and birth canal.

Blood clots can occur in different vessels in the body, including vessels in the arms, legs, and lungs. They can cause problems in the lungs and travel to the heart or brain, thereby leading to complications.

==== Unsafe abortion ====
When abortion is legal and accessible, it is widely regarded as safer for the mother than carrying a pregnancy to term and delivery. In fact, a study published in the journal Obstetrics & Gynecology reported that in the United States, carrying a pregnancy to term and delivering a baby comes with a 14 times increased risk of death for the mother as compared to a legal abortion. However, in many regions of the world, abortion is not legal and can be unsafe for the mother. Maternal deaths caused by improperly performed procedures are preventable and contribute 13% to the maternal mortality rate worldwide. This number is increased to 25% in countries where other causes of maternal mortality are low, such as in Eastern European and South American countries. This makes unsafe abortion practices the leading cause of maternal death worldwide.

Unsafe abortion is another major cause of maternal death worldwide. In regions where abortion is legal and accessible, abortion is safe and does not contribute greatly to overall rates of maternal death. However, in regions where abortions are not legal, available, or regulated, unsafe abortion practices can cause significant rates of maternal death. According to the World Health Organization in 2009, every eight minutes a woman died from complications arising from unsafe abortions.

The WHO defined unsafe abortion practices as procedures performed by someone without the appropriate training and/or ones that are performed in an environment that is not considered safe or clean. Using this definition, the WHO estimates that out of the 45 million abortions that are performed each year globally, 19 million of these are considered unsafe, and 97% of these unsafe abortions occur in developing countries. Complications include hemorrhage, infection, sepsis and genital trauma.

==== Rates ====
Infographic - History of Maternal Mortality in India

Four primary types of data sources are used to collect abortion-related maternal mortality rates: confidential enquiries, registration data, verbal autopsy, and facility-based data sources. A verbal autopsy is a systematic tool that is used to collect information on the cause of death from laypeople and not medical professionals.

Confidential enquiries for maternal deaths do not occur very often on a national level in most countries. Registration systems are usually considered the "gold standard" method for mortality measurements. However, they have been shown to miss anywhere between 30 and 50% of all maternal deaths. Another concern for registration systems is that 75% of all global births occur in countries where vital registration systems do not exist, meaning that many maternal deaths occurring during these pregnancies and deliveries may not be properly recorded through these methods. There are also issues with using verbal autopsies and other forms of surveys in recording maternal death rates. For example, the family's willingness to participate after the loss of a loved one, misclassification of the cause of death, and under-reporting all present obstacles to the proper reporting of maternal mortality causes. Finally, a potential issue with facility-based data collection on maternal mortality is the likelihood that women who experience abortion-related complications will seek care in medical facilities. This is due to fear of social repercussions or legal activity in countries where unsafe abortion is common since it is more likely to be legally restrictive and/or more highly stigmatizing. Another concern for issues related to errors in proper reporting for accurate understanding of maternal mortality is the fact that global estimates of maternal deaths related to a specific cause present those related to abortion as a proportion of the total mortality rate. Therefore, any change, whether positive or negative, in the abortion-related mortality rate is only compared relative to other causes, and this does not allow for proper implications of whether abortions are becoming safer or less safe with respect to the overall mortality of women.

==== Prevention ====
The prevention and reduction of maternity death is one of the United Nations' Sustainable Development Goals, specifically Goal 3, "Good health and well being". Promoting effective contraceptive use and information distributed to a wider population, with access to high-quality care, can make steps towards reducing the number of unsafe abortions. For nations that allow contraceptives, programs should be instituted to allow easier accessibility to these medications. However, this alone will not eliminate the demand for safe services, awareness on safe abortion services, health education on prenatal check-ups, and proper implementation of diets during pregnancy and lactation also contribute to its prevention.

=== Indirect obstetric deaths ===
Indirect obstetric deaths are caused by preexisting health problem worsened by pregnancy or newly developed health problem unrelated to pregnancy . Fatalities during but unrelated to a pregnancy are termed accidental, incidental, or non-obstetrical maternal deaths.

Indirect causes include malaria and anaemia. HIV/AIDS, and cardiovascular disease, all of which may complicate pregnancy or be aggravated by it. Risk factors associated with increased maternal death include the age of the mother, obesity before becoming pregnant, other pre-existing chronic medical conditions, and cesarean delivery.

=== Risk factors ===
According to a 2004 WHO publication, sociodemographic factors such as age, access to resources, and income level are significant indicators of maternal outcomes. Young mothers face higher risks of complications and death during pregnancy than older mothers, especially adolescents aged 15 years or younger. Adolescents have higher risks for postpartum hemorrhage, endometritis, operative vaginal delivery, episiotomy, low birth weight, preterm delivery, and small-for-gestational-age infants, all of which can lead to maternal death. The leading cause of death for girls at the age of 15 in developing countries is complications during pregnancy and childbirth. They have more pregnancies, on average, than women in developed countries, and it has been shown that 1 in 180 15-year-old girls in developing countries who become pregnant will die due to complications during pregnancy or childbirth. This is compared to women in developed countries, where the likelihood is 1 in 4900 live births. However, in the United States, as many women of older age continue to have children, the maternal mortality rate has risen in some states, especially among women over 40 years old.

Women in low-income countries face a lifetime risk of maternal death—defined as the probability that a 15-year-old girl will die from maternal causes—of 1 in 66, versus 1 in 7,933 in high-income countries.

Structural support and family support influence maternal outcomes. Mental health concerns in the perinatal period can also escalate into mental illnesses such as postpartum depression, postpartum psychosis, or postpartum anxiety which can be fatal. Furthermore, social disadvantage and social isolation adversely affects maternal health which can lead to increases in maternal death. Additionally, lack of access to skilled medical care during childbirth, the travel distance to the nearest clinic to receive proper care, number of prior births, barriers to accessing prenatal medical care and poor infrastructure all increase maternal deaths.

=== Causes of maternal death in the US ===
Pregnancy-related deaths between 2011 and 2014 in the United States have been shown to have major contributions from non-communicable diseases and conditions. The following are some of the more common causes related to maternal death: cardiovascular diseases (15.2%.), non-cardiovascular diseases (14.7%), infection or sepsis (12.8%), hemorrhage (11.5%), cardiomyopathy (10.3%), pulmonary embolism (9.1%), cerebrovascular accidents (7.4%), hypertensive disorders of pregnancy (6.8%), amniotic fluid embolism (5.5%), and anesthesia complications (0.3%).

In June 2022, the U.S. Supreme Court overturned Roe v. Wade (Dobbs v. Jackson Women's Health Organization), removing federal abortion protections. By 2020, maternal mortality rates were 62 % higher in abortion-restriction states than in abortion-access states (28.8 vs. 17.8 per 100,000 births). Analysis of CDC data (2019–2023) indicates that mothers in abortion-ban states are twice as likely to die during pregnancy, childbirth, or postpartum than those in states with legal abortion access.

=== Three delays model ===
The three delays model describes three critical factors that prevent women from receiving appropriate maternal health care. These factors include:

1. Delay in seeking care
2. Delay in reaching care
3. Delay in receiving adequate and appropriate care

Delays in seeking care are due to decisions made by pregnant women and/or other individuals. Decision-making individuals can include a spouse and family members. Examples of reasons for delays in seeking care include lack of knowledge about when to seek care, inability to afford health care, and women needing permission from family members.

Delays in reaching care include factors such as limitations in transportation to a medical facility, inadequate medical facilities in the area, and a lack of confidence in medicine.

Delays in receiving adequate and appropriate care may result from an inadequate number of trained providers, a lack of appropriate supplies, and a lack of urgency or understanding of an emergency.

The three delays model illustrates that there are a multitude of complex factors, both socioeconomic and cultural, that can result in maternal death.

== Measurement ==
The four measures of maternal death are the maternal mortality ratio (MMR), maternal mortality rate, lifetime risk of maternal death, and proportion of maternal deaths among deaths of women of reproductive age (PM).

Maternal mortality ratio (MMR) is the ratio of the number of maternal deaths during a given time period per 100,000 live births during the same time period. The MMR is used as a measure of the quality of a health care system.

Maternal mortality rate (MMRate) is the number of maternal deaths in a population divided by the number of women of reproductive age, usually expressed per 1,000 women.

The lifetime risk of maternal death is a calculated prediction of a woman's risk of death after each consecutive pregnancy. The calculation pertains to women during their reproductive years. The adult lifetime risk of maternal mortality can be derived using either the maternal mortality ratio (MMR), or the maternal mortality rate (MMRate).

The proportion of maternal deaths among deaths of women of reproductive age (PM) is the number of maternal deaths in a given time period divided by the total deaths among women aged 15–49 years.

Approaches to measuring maternal mortality include civil registration systems, household surveys, census, reproductive age mortality studies (RAMOS), and verbal autopsies. The most common household survey method, recommended by the WHO as time- and cost-effective, is the sisterhood method.

=== Trends ===
The United Nations Population Fund (UNFPA; formerly known as the United Nations Fund for Population Activities) has established programs that support efforts in reducing maternal death. These efforts include education and training for midwives, supporting access to emergency services in obstetric and newborn care networks, and providing essential drugs and family planning services to pregnant women or those planning to become pregnant. They also support efforts for review and response systems regarding maternal deaths.

According to the 2010 United Nations Population Fund report, low-resource nations account for ninety-nine percent of maternal deaths, with the majority of those deaths occurring in Sub-Saharan Africa and Southern Asia. Globally, high and middle-income countries experience lower maternal deaths than low-income countries. The Human Development Index (HDI) accounts for between 82 and 85 percent of the maternal mortality rates among countries. In most cases, high rates of maternal deaths occur in the same countries that have high rates of infant mortality. These trends reflect that higher-income countries have stronger healthcare infrastructure, more doctors, use more advanced medical technologies, and have fewer barriers to accessing care than low-income countries. In low-income countries, the most common cause of maternal death is obstetrical hemorrhage, followed by hypertensive disorders of pregnancy. This is in contrast to high-income countries, for which the most common cause is thromboembolism.

Between 1990 and 2015, the maternal mortality ratio decreased from 385 deaths per 100,000 live births to 216 maternal deaths per 100,000 live births. Some factors that have been attributed to the decreased maternal deaths seen between this period are in part to the access that women have gained to family planning services and skilled birth attendance, meaning a midwife, doctor, or trained nurse), with back-up obstetric care for emergencies that may occur during the process of labor. This can be examined further by looking at statistics in some areas of the world where inequities in access to health care services reflect an increased number of maternal deaths. The high maternal death rates also reflect disparate access to health services between resource communities and those that are high-resource or affluent.

From 2000 to 2020, the global maternal mortality ratio declined 34.8%—from 342 to 223 deaths per 100,000 live births—since 2000; however, over 700 women still died each day from preventable pregnancy- or childbirth-related causes. According to the World Health Organization, in 2023, a maternal death occurred almost every two minutes. In 2023, just over 90 % of maternal deaths occurred in low- and lower-middle-income countries. The maternal mortality ratio in these countries was 346 per 100,000 live births, compared with 10 per 100,000 live births in high-income countries. In high-income settings, racial, ethnic, and income disparities continue to impact maternal outcomes.

== Prevention ==
According to UNFPA, there are four essential elements for preventing maternal death. These include prenatal care, assistance with birth, access to emergency obstetric care, and adequate postnatal care. It is recommended that expectant mothers receive at least four antenatal visits to check and monitor the health of the mother and fetus. Second, skilled birth attendance with emergency backup, such as doctors, nurses, and midwives who can manage normal deliveries and recognize the onset of complications. Third, emergency obstetric care to address the major causes of maternal death, which are hemorrhage, sepsis, unsafe abortion, hypertensive disorders, and obstructed labor. Lastly, postnatal care, which is the six weeks following delivery. During this time, bleeding, sepsis, and hypertensive disorders can occur, and newborns are extremely vulnerable in the immediate aftermath of birth. Therefore, follow-up visits by a health worker to assess the health of both mother and child in the postnatal period are strongly recommended.

Additionally, reliable access to information, compassionate counseling, and quality services for the management of any issues that arise from abortions (whether safe or unsafe) can be beneficial in reducing the number of maternal deaths. In regions where abortion is legal, abortion practices need to be safe to reduce the number of maternal deaths related to abortion effectively.

Maternal Death Surveillance and Response is another strategy that has been used to prevent maternal death. This is one of the interventions proposed to reduce maternal mortality, where maternal deaths are continuously reviewed to learn the causes and factors that led to the death. The information from the reviews is used to make recommendations for action to prevent future similar deaths. Maternal and perinatal death reviews have been in practice for a long time worldwide, and the World Health Organization (WHO) introduced the Maternal and Perinatal Death Surveillance and Response (MPDSR) with a guideline in 2013. Studies have shown that acting on MPDSR recommendations can reduce maternal and perinatal mortality by improving the quality of care in the community and health facilities.

According to a 2023 systematic review published by the Patient Centered Outcomes Research Institute (PCORI) and the Agency for Healthcare Research and Quality (AHRQ), "More than 60 percent of pregnancy-related deaths are considered preventable". The World Health Organization (WHO) has developed a global goal to end preventable death related to maternal mortality. A major goal of this strategy is to identify and address the causes of maternal and reproductive morbidities and mortalities. This strategy aims to address inequalities in access to reproductive, maternal, and newborn services, as well as the quality of care, with universal health coverage. Maternal mortality is difficult to measure. Health information systems, such as the CRVS (Civil Registration and Vital Statistics), in most low-income countries are weak. Therefore, these systems cannot provide accurate assessments of maternal mortality. Even estimates derived from a complete system, such as the CRVs, suffer misclassification and underreporting of maternal death statistics. The WHO strategy also aims to ensure quality data collection to better respond to the needs of women and girls while improving the equity and quality of care provided to women.

=== Prenatal care ===
It was estimated that in 2015, a total of 303,000 women died due to causes related to pregnancy or childbirth. The majority of these were due to severe bleeding, sepsis or infections, eclampsia, obstructed labor, and consequences from unsafe abortions. Most of these causes are either preventable or have highly effective interventions. An important factor that contributes to the maternal mortality rate is access and opportunity to receive prenatal care. Women who do not receive prenatal care are between three and four times more likely to die from complications resulting from pregnancy or delivery than those who receive prenatal care. Even in high-resource countries, many women do not receive the appropriate preventative or prenatal care. For example, 25% of women in the United States do not receive the recommended number of prenatal visits. This number increases for women among traditionally marginalized populations—32% of African American women and 41% for American Indian and Alaska Native women do not receive the recommended preventative health services before delivery.

In 2023, a study reported that deaths among Native American women were three-and-a-half times that of white women. The report attributed the high rate in part to the fact that Native American women are cared for under a poorly funded Federal Health Care System that is so stretched that the average monthly visit lasts only from three to seven minutes. Such a short visit allows neither time for performing an adequate health assessment nor time for the patient to discuss any problems she may be experiencing.

=== Medical technologies ===
The decline in maternal deaths has been due largely to improved aseptic techniques, better fluid management and quicker access to blood transfusions, and better prenatal care.

Technologies have been designed for resource-poor settings that have been effective in reducing maternal deaths as well. The non-pneumatic anti-shock garment is a low-technology pressure device that decreases blood loss, restores vital signs and helps buy time in delay of women receiving adequate emergency care during obstetric hemorrhage. It has proven to be a valuable resource. Condoms used as uterine tamponades have also been effective in stopping post-partum hemorrhage.

=== Medications and surgical management ===
Some maternal deaths can be prevented through medication use. Injectable oxytocin can be used to prevent death due to postpartum bleeding. Additionally, postpartum infections can be treated using antibiotics. In fact, the use of broad-spectrum antibiotics both for the prevention and treatment of maternal infection is common in low-income countries. Maternal death due to eclampsia can also be prevented through the use of medications such as magnesium sulfate.

Many complications can be managed with procedures and/or surgery if there is access to a qualified surgeon and appropriate facilities and supplies. For example, the contents of the uterus can be cleaned if there is concern for remaining pregnancy tissue or infection. If there is concern for excess bleeding, special ties, stitches or tools (Bakri Balloon) can be placed if there is concern for excess bleeding.

=== Public health ===
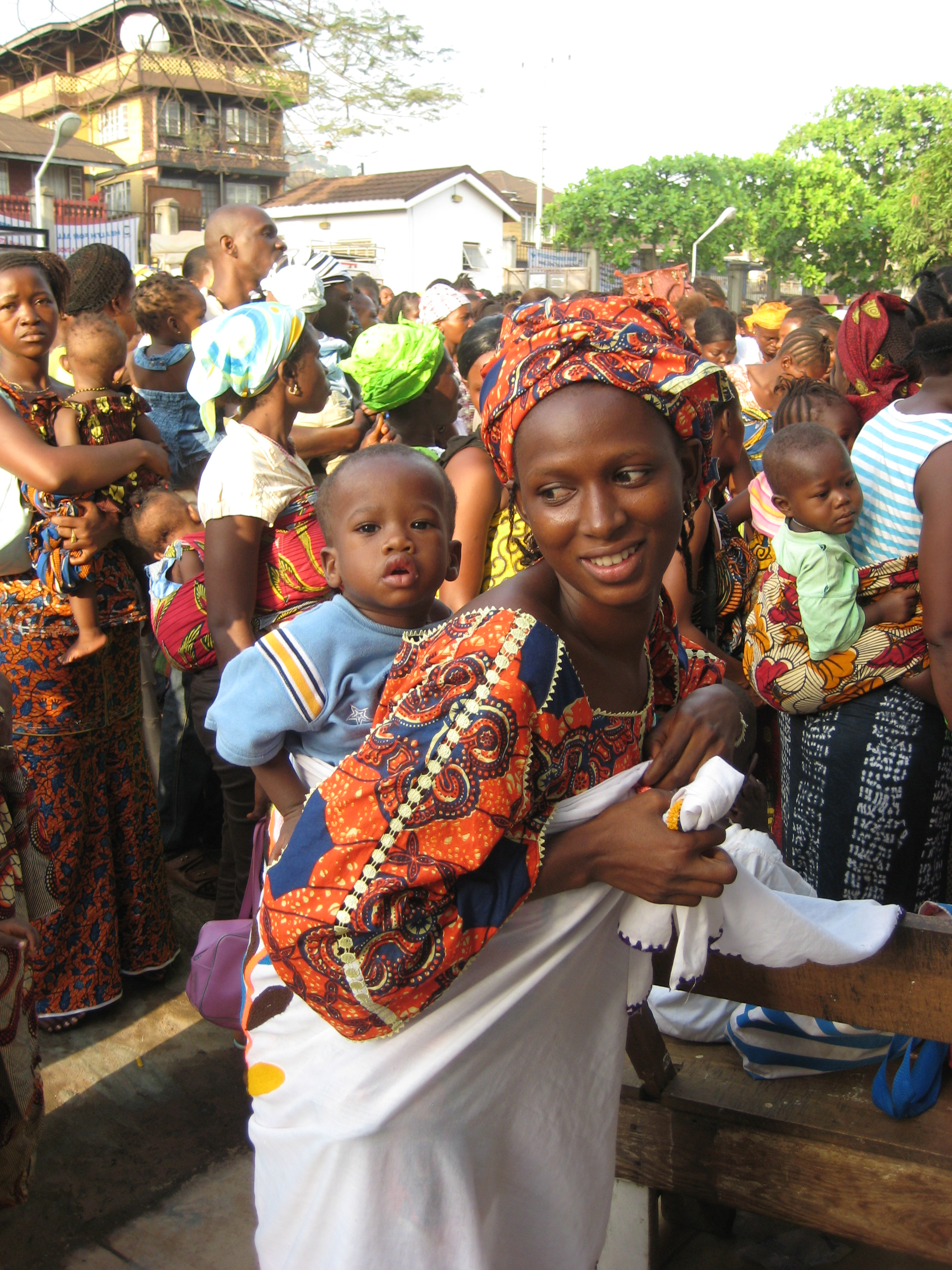
In April 2010, Sierra Leone launched free healthcare for pregnant and breastfeeding women.

A public health approach to addressing maternal mortality includes gathering information on the scope of the problem, identifying key causes, and implementing interventions, both before pregnancy and during pregnancy, to combat those causes and prevent maternal mortality.

Public health has a role to play in the analysis of maternal death. One important aspect in the review of maternal death and its causes are Maternal Mortality Review Committees or Boards. The goal of these review committees is to analyze each maternal death and determine its cause. After this analysis, the information can be combined to determine specific interventions that could prevent future maternal deaths. These review boards are generally comprehensive in their analysis of maternal deaths, examining details that include mental health factors, public transportation, chronic illnesses, and substance use disorders. All of this information can be combined to give a detailed picture of what is causing maternal mortality and help determine recommendations to reduce its impact.

Many states in the US are taking Maternal Mortality Review Committees a step further and are collaborating with various professional organizations to improve the quality of perinatal care. These teams of organizations form a "perinatal quality collaborative" (PQC) and include state health departments, the state hospital association, and clinical professionals such as doctors and nurses. These PQCs can also involve community health organizations, Medicaid representatives, Maternal Mortality Review Committees, and patient advocacy groups. By involving all of these major players within maternal health, the goal is to collaborate and determine opportunities to improve the quality of care. Through this collaborative effort, PQCs can aim to make an impact on quality both at the direct patient care level and through larger system devices like policy. It is thought that the institution of PQCs in California was the main contributor to the maternal mortality rate decreasing by 50% in the years following. The PQC developed review guides and quality improvement initiatives aimed at the most preventable and prevalent maternal deaths: those due to bleeding and high blood pressure. Success has also been observed with PQCs in Illinois and Florida.

Several interventions before pregnancy have been recommended in efforts to reduce maternal mortality. Increasing access to reproductive healthcare services, such as family planning services and safe abortion practices, is recommended to prevent unintended pregnancies. Several countries, including India, Brazil, and Mexico, have seen some success in efforts to promote the use of reproductive healthcare services. Other interventions include high quality sex education, which includes pregnancy prevention and sexually transmitted infection (STI) prevention and treatment. By addressing STIs, this not only reduces perinatal infections, but can also help reduce ectopic pregnancy caused by STIs. Adolescent mothers are between two and five times more likely to die than a female twenty years or older. Access to reproductive services and sex education could make a large impact, specifically on adolescents, who are generally uneducated regarding carrying a healthy pregnancy. Education level is a strong predictor of maternal health as it gives women the knowledge to seek care when it is needed. Public health efforts can also intervene during pregnancy to improve maternal outcomes. Areas for intervention have been identified in access to care, public knowledge, awareness of signs and symptoms of pregnancy complications, and improving relationships between healthcare professionals and expectant mothers.

Access to care during pregnancy is a significant issue in the face of maternal mortality. "Access" encompasses a wide range of potential difficulties, including costs, location of healthcare services, appointment availability, availability of trained healthcare workers, transportation services, and cultural or language barriers that could inhibit a woman from receiving proper care. For women carrying a pregnancy to term, access to necessary antenatal (before delivery) healthcare visits is crucial to ensuring healthy outcomes. These antenatal visits allow for early recognition and treatment of complications, treatment of infections, and the opportunity to educate the expecting mother on how to manage her current pregnancy and the health advantages of spacing pregnancies apart.

Access to a birthing facility with a skilled healthcare provider present has been associated with safer deliveries and better outcomes. The two areas bearing the largest burden of maternal mortality, Sub-Saharan Africa and South Asia, also had the lowest percentage of births attended by a skilled provider, at just 45% and 41% respectively. Emergency obstetric care is also crucial in preventing maternal mortality by offering services like emergency cesarean sections, blood transfusions, antibiotics for infections, and assisted vaginal delivery with forceps or vacuum. In addition to physical barriers that restrict access to healthcare, financial barriers also exist. Approximately one in seven women of childbearing age has no health insurance. This lack of insurance impacts access to pregnancy prevention, treatment of complications, as well as perinatal care visits contributing to maternal mortality.

By increasing public knowledge and awareness through health education programs about pregnancy, including signs of complications that need addressed by a healthcare provider, this will increase the likelihood of an expecting mother to seek help when it is necessary. Higher levels of education have been associated with increased use of contraception and family planning services as well as antenatal care. Addressing complications at the earliest sign of a problem can improve outcomes for expecting mothers, which makes it extremely important for a pregnant woman to be knowledgeable enough to seek healthcare for potential complications. Improving the relationships between patients and the healthcare system as a whole will make it easier for a pregnant woman to feel comfortable seeking help. Good communication between patients and providers, as well as cultural competence of the providers, could also assist in increasing compliance with recommended treatments.

Another important preventive measure being implemented is specialized education for mothers. Doctors and medical professionals providing simple information to women, especially women in lower socioeconomic areas will decrease the miscommunication that often occurs between doctors and patients. Training health care professionals will be another important aspect in decreasing the rate of maternal death, "The study found that white medical students and residents often believed incorrect and sometimes 'fantastical' biological fallacies about racial differences in patients. For these assumptions, researchers blamed not individual prejudice but deeply ingrained unconscious stereotypes about people of color, as well as physicians' difficulty in empathizing with patients whose experiences differ from their own."

=== Policy ===
The largest global policy initiative for maternal health came from the United Nations' Millennium Declaration, which created the Millennium Development Goals. In 2012, this evolved at the United Nations Conference on Sustainable Development to become the Sustainable Development Goals (SDGs) with a target year of 2030. The SDGs are 17 goals that call for global collaboration to tackle a wide variety of recognized problems. Goal 3 focuses on ensuring health and well-being for women of all ages. A specific target is to achieve a global maternal mortality ratio of less than 70 per 100,000 live births. So far, specific progress has been made in births attended by a skilled provider, now at 80% of births worldwide compared with 62% in 2005.

Countries and local governments have taken political steps to reduce maternal deaths. Researchers at the Overseas Development Institute studied maternal health systems in four apparently similar countries: Rwanda, Malawi, Niger, and Uganda. In comparison to the other three countries, Rwanda has an excellent record of improving maternal death rates. Based on their investigation of these varying country case studies, the researchers conclude that improving maternal health depends on three key factors:

1. reviewing all maternal health-related policies frequently to ensure that they are internally coherent;
2. enforcing standards on providers of maternal health services;
3. any local solutions to problems discovered should be promoted, not discouraged.

In terms of aid policy, proportionally, aid given to improve maternal mortality rates has shrunken as other public health issues, such as HIV/AIDS and malaria, have become major international concerns. Maternal health aid contributions tend to be lumped together with newborn and child health, so it is difficult to assess how much aid is given directly to maternal health to help lower the rates of maternal mortality. Regardless, there has been progress in reducing maternal mortality rates internationally.

In countries where abortion practices are not considered legal, it is necessary to look at the access that women have to high-quality family planning services, since some of the restrictive policies around abortion could impede access to these services. These policies may also affect the proper collection of information for monitoring maternal health globally.

As a result of cuts to foreign aid during the second administration of US president Donald Trump, maternal health clinics closed, disrupting "vital services for maternal, newborn and child health" according to the World Health Organization (WHO).

Significant progress has been made since the United Nations made reducing maternal mortality part of the Millennium Development Goals (MDGs) in 2000. Bangladesh, for example, cut the number of deaths per live births by almost two-thirds from 1990 to 2015. A further reduction of maternal mortality is now part of the Agenda 2030 for sustainable development. The United Nations recently developed a list of goals termed the Sustainable Development Goals. Some of the specific aims of the Sustainable Development Goals are to prevent unintended pregnancies by ensuring more women have access to contraceptives, as well as providing women who become pregnant with a safe environment for delivery with respectful and skilled care. This initiative also included access to emergency services for women who developed complications during delivery.

==== Policies in the United States ====
Additionally, in the United States, Black women are more likely to die during and from childbirth than any other demographic. While researchers have documented the higher rate of maternal mortality in Black women, they have not extensively researched the ways to improve the outcomes of maternal mortality in black mothers positively. In 2022, President Joe Biden signed the "Data Mapping to Save Moms' Lives Act" into law, just before Christmas, and with the support of the AMA (American Medical Association). The law called for the Federal Communications Commission—in consultation with the Centers for Disease Control and Prevention (CDC) to incorporate publicly available data on maternal mortality and severe maternal morbidity for at least one year postpartum into its Mapping Broadband Health in America platform Regardless, a concerted study on the policy outcome on black women’s mortality rate is a rarity.

Additionally, in February 2021, Senator Cory Booker and Representatives Lauren Underwood and Alma Adams reintroduced the Black Maternal Health Momnibus Act. It consisted of thirteen bills aimed at improving maternal health. Six of the bills specifically target Black maternal health or related factors that impact it. The legislation aimed to save lives, reduce health care disparities, and ensure all mothers received proper care, regardless of race or circumstances. The Momnibus is a set of laws focused on improving maternal health in the United States. However, the bill was only introduced, not passed.

There have been varying policies regarding maternal mortality that have aimed to prevent or lower the rate of maternal mortality for women in the U.S. during and post-partum. An example of such policies is the IMPROVE initiative, started by the National Institutes of Health (NIH) in 2019 to address maternal health issues. The initiative aimed to reduce preventable maternal deaths, lower serious health problems during pregnancy, and promote health equity. It then examined various factors—biological, behavioral, social, and structural—to create better care and outcomes for specific groups and areas. The initiative emphasized the importance of collaborating with new partners and communities to find solutions to the problem of maternal health crisis. The NIH also started the Connecting the Community for Maternal Health Challenge to help community groups build their research skills. They offered training and support to create research proposals that address local needs.

Before the IMPROVE initiative in 2019, other past policies were either passed or made regarding maternal mortality. An example of this was in 2014, when the US Department of Health and Human Services funded the American College of Obstetrics and Gynecology to create the Alliance for Innovation on Maternal Health (AIM) program. The point of AIM was to collaborate with state and hospital partners for the purpose of implementing safety measures aimed at improving maternal care quality and outcomes. Through evidence-based practices, such as a toolkit for managing hemorrhage and hypertension in pregnancy, AIM had helped reduce maternal morbidity rates from 22.1% to 8.3%.

California could be used as an exemplar of how to implement policies regarding maternal health. California implemented three measures to battle maternal mortality: (1) Increase funding for federal programs to address social determinants of maternal health (2) Support health care strategies to improve maternal health, including developing national standards and goals for health care systems (3) Increase investments in maternal health monitoring and surveillance. For the first measure, an example was how California created the Black Infant Health Program (BIH) to support black mothers, reduce their stress, and build social support. The program was funded by Federal Title V Maternal and Child Health Block Grant, Federal Title XIX Medicaid Funds, and State General Funds.

Some policies regarding maternal health are nuanced. For example, it was discovered that states with stricter abortion laws had a 7% higher maternal mortality rate than states with much less strict laws. Access to healthcare for pregnant individuals from low-income backgrounds is very crucial.

== Epidemiology ==
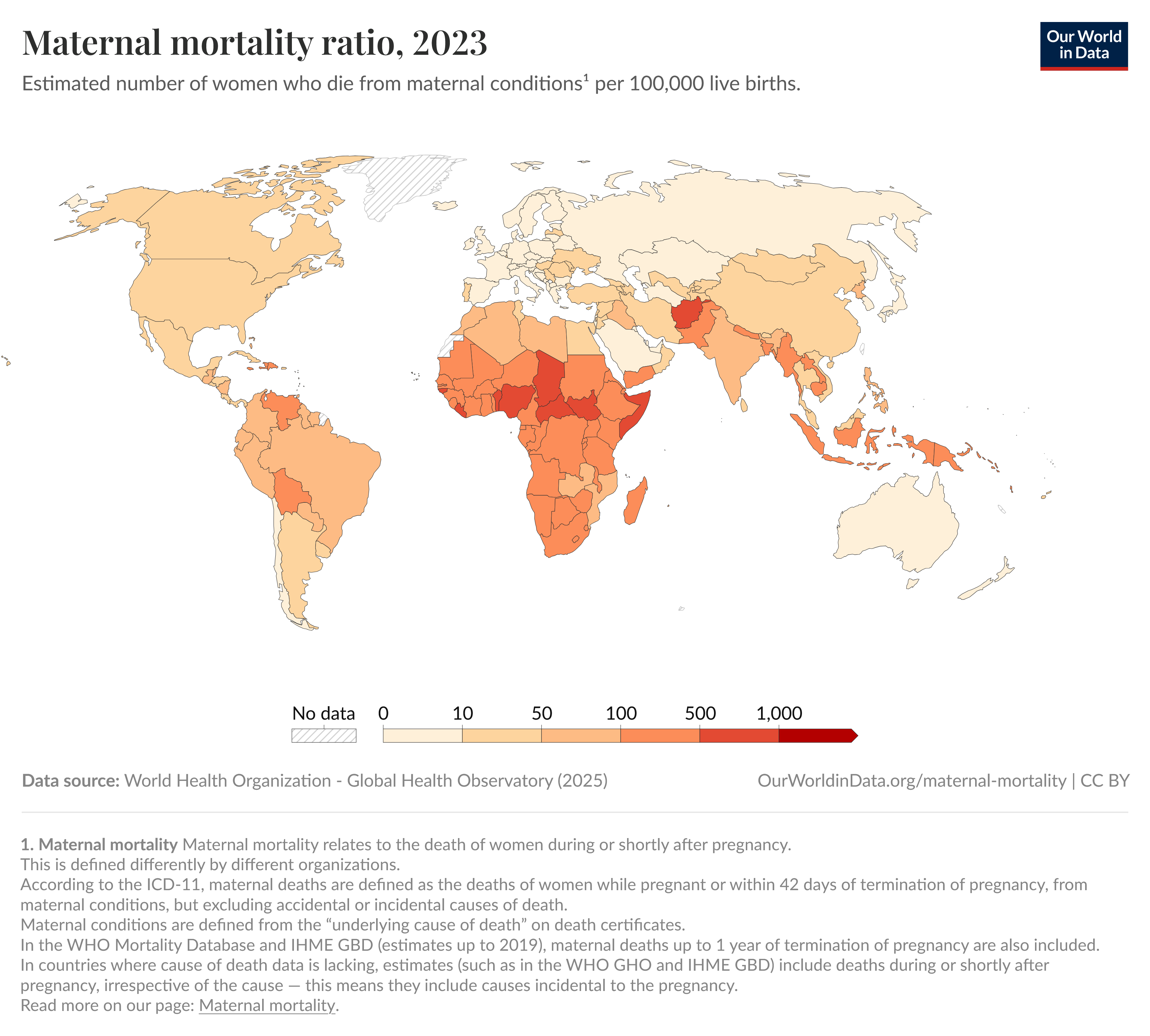
Maternal mortality ratio per 100,000 live births.

Maternal mortality and morbidity are leading contributors to women's health. It is estimated that 303,000 women are killed each year in childbirth and pregnancy worldwide. The global rate in 2017 is 211 maternal deaths per 100,000 live births and 45% of postpartum deaths occur within 24 hours. Whereas in 2020, the global rate was 223 deaths per 100,000 live births. In 2023, it was 191 deaths per 100,000 live births. Ninety-nine percent of maternal deaths occur in low-resource countries.

=== Prevalence by country ===
India (19% or 56,000) and Nigeria (14% or 40,000) accounted for roughly one third of the maternal deaths in 2010. Democratic Republic of the Congo, Pakistan, Sudan, Indonesia, Ethiopia, United Republic of Tanzania, Bangladesh and Afghanistan accounted for between 3 and 5 percent of maternal deaths each. These ten countries combined accounted for 60% of all the maternal deaths in 2010, according to the United Nations Population Fund report. Countries with the lowest maternal deaths were Greece, Iceland, Poland, and Finland.

In 2017, countries in Southeast Asia and Sub-Saharan Africa accounted for approximately 86% of all maternal deaths worldwide. As of 2020, Sub-Saharan African countries such as South Sudan, Chad, and Nigeria had the highest maternal deaths per 100,000 live births. Since 2000, Southeast Asian countries have seen a significant decrease in maternal mortality of almost 60%. Sub-Saharan Africa also saw an almost 40% decrease in maternal mortality between 2000 and 2017.

The maternal mortality ratio (MMR) is the annual number of female deaths per 100,000 live births from any cause related to or aggravated by pregnancy or its management (excluding accidental or incidental causes).

Country	Maternal mortality ratio (2017)
Italy	2
Spain	4
Sweden	4
Japan	5
Australia	6
Germany	7
UK	7
France	8
New Zealand	9
Canada	10
South Korea	11
Russia	17
US	19
Mexico	33
China	29
South Africa	119
India	145
Ghana	308

=== Prevalence by race and ethnicity ===
==== In the United States ====
In the United States, women who are black and non-Hispanic experience pregnancy-related death at a significantly higher rate. They are three to four times as likely to succumb to maternal mortality than non-Hispanic white women. In the United States between the years of 2007 and 2014, women who identify as non-Hispanic and black had a significant increase in death related to pregnancy.

In the United States, according to the Centers for Disease Control and Prevention (CDC), the maternal mortality rate in 2021 was 32.9 deaths per 100,000 live births. This is significantly higher than the rates in 2020, defined as 23.8 deaths per 100,000 live births and 20.1 in 2019. In 2021, the maternal mortality rate for non-Hispanic Black women was 69.9 deaths per 100,000 live births, which is 2.6 times higher than non-Hispanic White women. The mortality rate for women over the age of 40 was 6.8 times higher than the rate for women under the age of 25.

Research indicates that these disparities in the U.S. are not due to genetic differences, but rather systemic factors, including racial bias in healthcare, inadequate access to high-quality maternity care, and higher rates of chronic conditions like hypertension and preeclampsia.

Implicit bias among healthcare providers has been documented as a contributing factor to these disparities, leading to the dismissal of Black women's pain and symptoms, resulting in delayed or inadequate treatment. Studies have found that some healthcare providers incorrectly believe that Black patients feel less pain, which has been linked to delays in diagnosing and managing pregnancy-related complications like preeclampsia and hemorrhage

Additionally, Black women face barriers to high-quality maternal care, including living in maternity care deserts, a lack of access to midwifery and doula services, and financial challenges due to inadequate insurance coverage. Many states have restrictive policies on midwifery care, which further limits Black women's access to alternatives that have been shown to improve maternal outcomes

The disparities in maternal health outcomes are also present among racial groups. Black and American Indian/Alaska Native (AI/AN) women experience pregnancy-related mortality rates over three times those of White women. In 2020, rates were 55.9 and 63.4 per 100,000 live births for Black and AI/AN women, respectively, versus 18.1 for White women; Native Hawaiian/Pacific Islander women had a rate of 62.8. In 2023, the CDC's Pregnancy Mortality Surveillance System reported pregnancy-related mortality ratios of 49.4 for Black women and 14.9 for White women per 100,000 live births.

In the United States, black women are 3-4 times more likely to die from maternal mortality than white women. Unequal access to quality medical care, socioeconomic disparities, and systemic racism by health care providers are factors that have contributed to the high maternal mortality rates among black women. Discounting factors such as pre-existing conditions, do not impact the rate of this disparity.

The COVID-19 pandemic heightened maternal mortality rates, disproportionately impacting communities of color. Multiple factors contribute to this widening disparity, notably, social factors such as implicit bias, repeated racial discrimination, and limited access to healthcare. All issues are further exacerbated for people of color who face systemic barriers to adequate medical care. Overall, the maternal mortality rate increased from 23.8 deaths per 100,000 live births in 2020, to 32.9 deaths per 100,000 live births in 2021. An apparent spike in this rate can be noted in 2021. For non-hispanic black women the rate of maternal deaths per 100,00 live births increased from 44.0 in 2019 to 69.9 in 2021.

==== Elsewhere ====
Similar patterns exist in other countries. In Brazil, women who are not white were 3.5 times as likely to die because of obstetric mortality compared to white women. The maternal mortality ratio is larger in women who are from Sub-Saharan Africa in France.

=== COVID-19 effects ===
Global maternal mortality and fetal outcomes have worsened during the COVID-19 pandemic. Increases in maternal deaths, stillbirths, ruptured ectopic pregnancies, and maternal depression occurred globally during this time. According to The Lancet Global Health, their search, which included over 40 studies, identified significant increases in stillbirth and maternal death during the pandemic versus before the pandemic. According to the United Nations Population Fund, UNFPA, a proportion of total COVID-19 deaths were indirect obstetric deaths where a woman's death was due to the aggravation between the disease and the state of pregnancy. Some outcomes show considerable disparity between low- and high-resource settings. This drives the urgent global need to prioritize safe, equitable, and accessible maternal care in future healthcare crises.

=== Variation within countries ===
There are significant maternal mortality intra-country variations, especially in nations with large inequality gaps in income and education and high healthcare disparities. Women living in rural areas experience higher maternal mortality than women living in urban and suburban centers because those living in wealthier households, having higher education, or living in urban areas, have higher use of healthcare services than their poorer, less-educated, or rural counterparts. There are also racial and ethnic disparities in maternal health outcomes which increases maternal mortality in marginalized groups.

== Related terms ==
=== Severe maternal morbidity ===
Severe maternal morbidity (SMM) is an unanticipated acute or chronic health outcome after labor and delivery that detrimentally affects a woman's health. Severe Maternal Morbidity (SMM) includes any unexpected outcomes from labor or delivery that cause both short and long-term consequences to the mother's overall health. There are nineteen total indicators used by the CDC to help identify SMM, with the most prevalent indicator being a blood transfusion. Other indicators include an acute myocardial infarction ("heart attack"), aneurysm, and kidney failure. All of this identification is done by using ICD-10 codes, which are disease identification codes found in hospital discharge data. Using these definitions that rely on these codes should be used with careful consideration since some may miss some cases, have a low predictive value, or may be difficult for different facilities to operationalize. There are certain screening criteria that may be helpful and are recommended through the American College of Obstetricians and Gynecologists as well as the Society for Maternal-Fetal Medicine (SMFM). These screening criteria for SMM are for transfusions of four or more units of blood and admission of a pregnant woman or a postpartum woman to an ICU facility or unit.

The greatest proportion of women with SMM are those who require a blood transfusion during delivery, mostly due to excessive bleeding. Blood transfusions given during delivery due to excessive bleeding have increased the rate of mothers with SMM. The rate of SMM has increased almost 200% between 1993 (49.5 per 100,000 live births) and 2014 (144.0 per 100,000 live births). This can be seen with the increased rate of blood transfusions given during delivery, which increased from 1993 (24.5 per 100,000 live births) to 2014 (122.3 per 100,000 live births).

In the United States, severe maternal morbidity has increased over the last several years, impacting more than 50,000 women in 2014 alone. There is no conclusive reason for this dramatic increase. It is thought that the overall state of health of pregnant women is impacting these rates. For example, complications can derive from underlying chronic medical conditions like diabetes, obesity, HIV/AIDS, and high blood pressure. These underlying conditions are also thought to lead to increased risk of maternal mortality.

The increased rate for SMM can also be indicative of potentially increased rates for maternal mortality, since without identification and treatment of SMM, these conditions would lead to increased maternal death rates. Therefore, diagnosis of SMM can be considered a "near miss" for maternal mortality. With this consideration, several different expert groups have urged obstetric hospitals to review SMM cases for opportunities that can lead to improved care, which in turn would lead to improvements with maternal health and a decrease in the number of maternal deaths.

== See also ==
- Child health
- Confidential Enquiry into Maternal Deaths in the UK
- Infant mortality
- Child mortality
- List of women who died in childbirth
- Maternal mortality in fiction
- Maternal near miss
- Obstetric transition
- Perinatal mortality
- Black maternal mortality in the United States

== Bibliography ==
- World Health Organization (2014). Trends in maternal mortality: 1990 to 2013 (PDF). WHO. ISBN 978-92-4-150722-6.
- Jashnani KD, ed. (27 September 2022). Maternal Mortality - Lessons Learnt from Autopsy. Springer. ISBN 978-981-19-3420-9.
- Drife JO, Lewis G, Neilson JP, Knight M, Cooper G, Cantwell R (2023-01-31). Why Mothers Died and How their Lives are Saved. Cambridge University Press. ISBN 978-1-009-21880-1.
