= Uterine artery embolization =

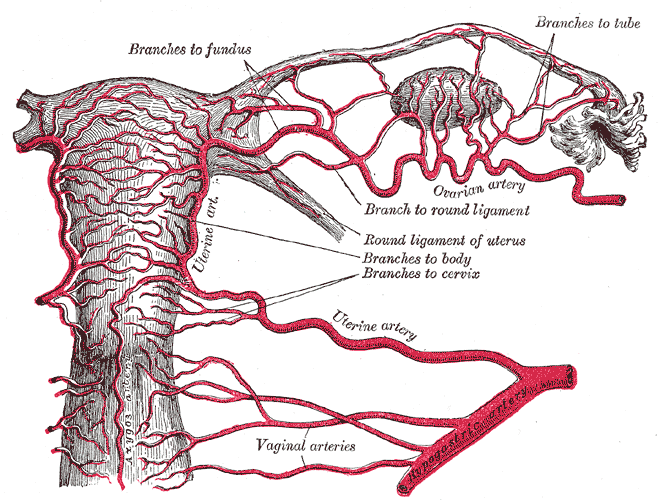
- Arteries of the female reproductive tract (posterior view): uterine artery, ovarian artery and vaginal arteries
- Specialty: Interventional radiology

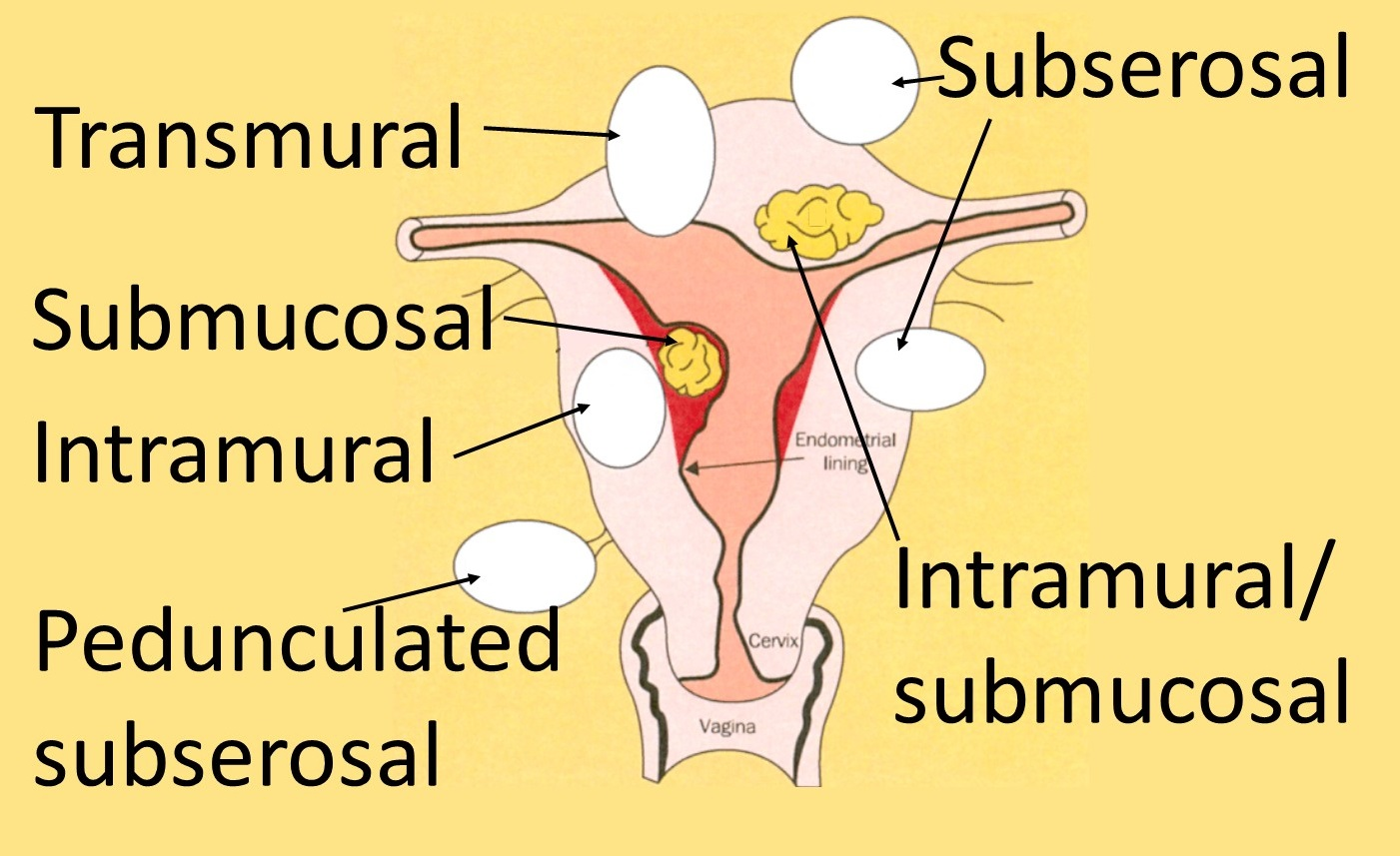
Illustration of uterine fibroids with examples of their possible locations

Uterine artery embolization (UAE, uterine fibroid embolization, or UFE) is a procedure in which an interventional radiologist uses a catheter to deliver small particles that block the blood supply to the uterine body. The procedure is primarily done for the treatment of uterine fibroids and adenomyosis. Compared to surgical treatment for fibroids such as a hysterectomy, in which a woman's uterus is removed, uterine artery embolization may be beneficial in women who wish to retain their uterus. Other reasons for uterine artery embolization are postpartum hemorrhage and uterine arteriovenous malformations.

== Medical uses ==
Uterine fibroids are the most common type of benign uterine tumor and are composed of smooth muscle. They often cause bulk-related symptoms, which can be characterized by back pain, heaviness in the pelvic area, abdominal bloating. Uterine artery embolization may be done to treat bothersome bulk-related symptoms as well as abnormal or heavy uterine bleeding due to uterine fibroids. Fibroid size, number, and location are three potential predictors of a successful outcome. Specifically, studies have demonstrated that submucosal (directly underneath the uterine lining) fibroids demonstrated the largest reduction in size while subserosal (outer layer of the uterus) had the smallest reduction.

Uterine artery embolization may also be appropriate for the treatment of adenomyosis, which is when the lining of the uterus aberrantly grows into the muscle of the uterus. Symptoms of adenomyosis include heavy or prolonged menstrual bleeding and painful menstrual periods.

Uterine artery embolization can also be used to control heavy uterine bleeding for reasons other than fibroids, such as postpartum obstetrical hemorrhage. Many women who experience postpartum hemorrhage may be successfully treated with medication or uterine balloon tamponade. However, in cases where women continue to bleed, uterine artery embolization may be an appropriate option.

A less common indication for uterine artery embolization is for the treatment of uterine arteriovenous malformations which can be a cause of abnormal uterine bleeding or life-threatening bleeding. Roughly half of women with uterine arteriovenous malformations are born with them while the remaining form following surgical interventions or may be due to uterine tumors.

== Contra-indications ==
Prior to undergoing UAE, the patient should be evaluated for the following absolute contra-indications to the procedure: a viable pregnancy, a current infection that is not being treated, or gynecologic malignancy (except for cases where UAE is being used as a procedure in addition to treatment for the cancer). Relative contra-indications for the procedure include a severe contrast allergy since contrast is necessary to visualize the arteries during the procedure, kidney impairment since contrast may cause damage to the kidneys, or coagulopathy (blood disorder that causes prolonged or excessive bleeding). However, all of the stated relative contra-indications can be managed with appropriate pre-operative planning.

== Risks/Complications ==
The rate of serious complications is comparable to that of myomectomy or hysterectomy. The advantage of somewhat faster recovery time is offset by a higher rate of minor complications and an increased likelihood of requiring surgical intervention within two to five years of the initial procedure. An analysis of 15,000 women found that those who had myomectomy required fewer additional procedures, including hysterectomies, to treat fibroids over the next five years than those who had uterine artery embolization.

Complications include the following:

- Death is a very rare complication that may be caused by pulmonary embolism or sepsis (the presence of pus-forming or other pathogenic organisms, or their toxins, in the blood or tissues) resulting in multiple organ failure The cause of a pulmonary embolism is attributed to the time where patients are immobile following the procedure, which makes the formation of a deep venous thrombosis and subsequent pulmonary embolism more likely.
- Infection from tissue death of fibroids, leading to endometritis (infection of the uterus) resulting in lengthy hospitalization for intravenous antibiotics
- Fibroid expulsion (fibroids push out through the vagina). The occurrence of this is highly variable and dependent on the location of the fibroid within the uterine tissue. When it does occur, it most commonly happens about 3 months following treatment.
- Post-embolization syndrome – characterized by acute and/or chronic pain, fevers, malaise, nausea, vomiting and severe night sweats; foul vaginal odor coming from infected, necrotic tissue which remains inside the uterus; hysterectomy due to infection, pain or failure of embolization
- Misembolization from microspheres or polyvinyl alcohol particles flowing or drifting into organs or tissues where they were not intended to be, causing damage to other organs or other parts of the body such as ovaries, bladder, rectum, and rarely small bowel, uterus, vagina, and labia.
- Failure – continued fibroid growth, regrowth within four months
- Menopause – iatrogenic, abnormal, cessation of menstruation and follicle stimulating hormones elevated to menopausal levels
- Hematoma, blood clot at the incision site; vaginal discharge containing pus and blood, bleeding from incision site, bleeding from vagina, life-threatening allergic reaction to the contrast material.

== Technique ==
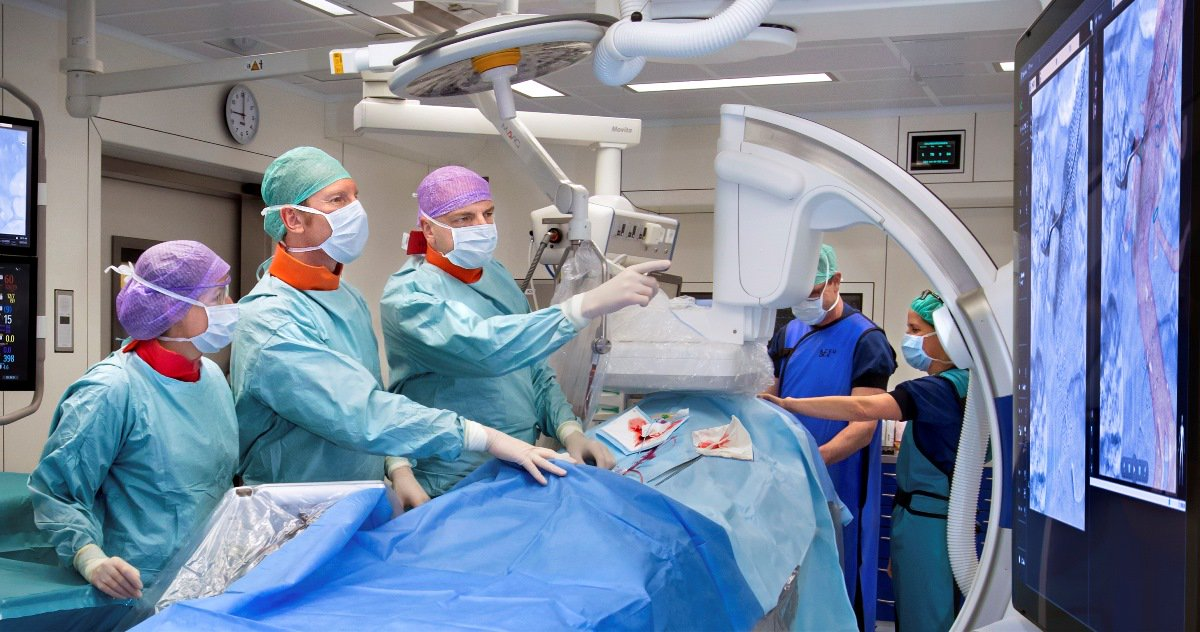
After access to the femoral or radial artery is established through needle puncture, interventional radiologists use image guidance to perform the procedure. The screen in front of the doctors provides a live image of the tools that are being used throughout the procedure as they navigate to the artery that they would like to embolize (block off). Administration of embolizing agents that are used to block off the arteries can also be seen in real-time.

=== Pre-operative preparation ===
Prior to a uterine artery embolization, patients should undergo a clinic visit with their gynecologist, have a recent Pap smear, and an endometrial biopsy in cases where abnormal uterine bleeding is a presenting symptom. A clinic visit can then be made with the interventional radiologist performing the uterine artery embolization so that a thorough history and physical exam can be taken. Recent diagnostic imaging such as a pelvic magnetic resonance imaging (MRI) should also be reviewed by the interventional radiologist to rule out possible malignancy, evaluate uterine anatomy, and discuss the likelihood of fibroid passage with the patient.

=== Procedure ===
The procedure is performed by an interventional radiologist under conscious sedation. Access is commonly through the radial or femoral artery via the wrist or groin, respectively. After anesthetizing the skin over the artery of choice, the artery is accessed by a needle puncture using the Seldinger technique. Under fluoroscopic guidance, a catheter is then introduced into the artery and used to select the uterine vessels for subsequent embolization. Once at the level of the uterine artery an angiogram with contrast is performed to confirm placement of the catheter, and the embolizing agent (spheres or beads) is released. As more embolizing agent is administered, blood flow will slow down significantly. Over time, the decreased blood flow causes the fibroid to shrink. Both the left and right uterine arteries are embolized since unilateral UAEs have a high risk of failure. The procedure can be performed in a hospital or surgical center. More recently, there has been support for UAE as an outpatient procedure, but many doctors choose an overnight admission for pain control. Follow-up for the procedure may vary based on institution, but can include a clinic appointment at 1 to 3 months following the procedure and an MRI to see if the fibroids have shrunk from the preoperative MRI.

== Recovery ==
The vast majority of women who undergo UAE experience elimination of abnormal uterine bleeding and improvement in bulk symptoms. Additionally, patient satisfaction following the procedure is about 80%. One drawback of UAE is that it appears to require more repeat procedures than if surgery was done initially. However, long-term patient satisfaction outcomes of UAE are similar to that of surgery and a short-term benefit is the reduction in hospital stay with UAE.

Currently the number of studies that compare pregnancy rates between UAE and myomectomy are limited. However, a 2020 systematic review assessing pregnancy outcomes after UAE for fibroids demonstrated that pregnancy rates between UAE and myomectomy are comparable. Additionally, they found that rates of pregnancy-related complications in women who underwent UAE were similar to that of the general population. Despite these findings, there is still a lack of randomized control trials that directly compare the outcomes of myomectomy and UAE for fibroids, so future studies are needed to determine which procedure yields better results.

For women with adenomyosis, the data regarding outcomes is limited. However, studies have demonstrated that about 83% of women with adenomyosis experienced an improvement in their symptoms. Additionally, the rate of improvement in symptoms increased to about 93% in women who had both adenomyosis and fibroids.

Regarding cost, the American Journal of Gynecology reports that uterine artery embolization costs 12% less than hysterectomy and 8% less than myomectomy.

== History ==
UAE was used for the first time in 1979 to control bleeding in a woman with postpartum hemorrhage that did not improve after surgical treatment. Since then studies have shown that UAE is a safe and effective procedure for postpartum hemorrhage with control of bleeding in greater than 90% of women. The initial use of UAE for patients with fibroids was to limit bleeding during myomectomy. During the 1990s, doctors began expanding the indications for UAE and started using it for the treatment of the fibroids specifically. Previously, the primary treatment methods for fibroids were myomectomy or hysterectomy. Compared to surgery, UAE can be advantageous because blood loss is typically minimal, surgery and general anesthesia is avoided, recovery is shorter, and women can retain their uterus (relative to hysterectomy). UAE is thought to treat fibroids by selectively decreasing blood flow to the tumor since it is highly vascular, which causes improvement in abnormal bleeding and the bulk symptoms that are often experienced with fibroids.

== Research ==
For removing uterine fibroids, myomectomy and uterine artery embolisation seem to be equally effective in improving quality of life, as measured 4 years after surgery.
