= Boggy uterus =

Medical condition

A boggy uterus is a finding upon physical examination where the uterus is more flaccid than would be expected.

It can be associated with uterine atony.

It may also be associated with adenomyosis.
