= Uterine balloon tamponade =

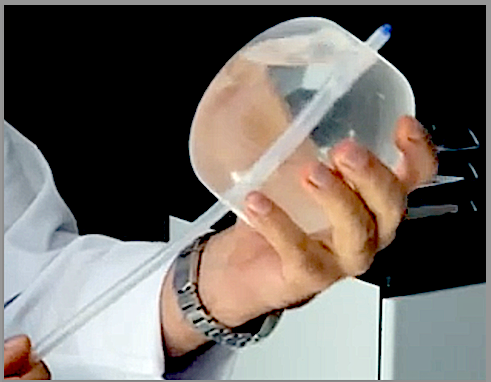
- Specialty: Obgyn

Uterine balloon tamponade (UBT) is a non-surgical method of treating refractory postpartum hemorrhage. Once postpartum hemorrhage has been identified and medical management given (including agents such as uterotonics and tranexamic acid), UBT may be employed to tamponade uterine bleeding without the need to pursue operative intervention. Numerous studies have supported the efficacy of UBT as a means of managing refractory postpartum hemorrhage. The International Federation of Gynecology and Obstetrics (FIGO) and the World Health Organization (WHO) recommend UBT as second-line treatment for severe postpartum hemorrhage.

== Method ==
Regardless of which device is used, all share the same basic components and method of application. The UBT generally consists of a balloon, a catheter or some form of tubing to inflate the balloon, and a syringe to inflate the balloon. Balloons range from home-grown interventions such as a condom or glove, to custom made silicone balloons. After performing uterine massage and evacuating the uterine cavity, the deflated balloon is inserted through the cervix into the uterine cavity in a semi-sterile fashion. Once positioned, the medical provider inflates the balloon, typically using saline, through the syringe and tubing, until bleeding slows or stops. A second, smaller balloon is sometimes included in UBT kits in order to secure the device inside the uterus. The patient should be monitored closely after insertion to observe for any further bleeding or clinical decompensation. If bleeding has ceased, balloons are left in place for anywhere from 24 to 36 hours in order to control postpartum hemorrhage, or until uterine contraction and subsequent expulsion of the device occurs. If bleeding is not abated using UBT, operative intervention such as B-lynch sutures or obstetric hysterectomy, should be pursued.

== Devices ==
Various UBT devices are available. Each device varies in cost, reusability, and in the body of evidence supporting its efficacy. The list below is not exhaustive.

=== Condom-catheter ===
Condom-catheter uterine balloon tamponade devices are the least expensive and generally most accessible globally, as they are constructed from commonly available medical supplies including a condom and foley catheter.

=== ESM-UBT ===
The ESM-UBT, developed by the Vayu Global Health Foundation, was specifically designed for implementation in low-resource settings and costs a fraction compared to upwards of US$300 for other commercially available devices. The FDA approved device consists of a size 24 urinary catheter, condoms, o-rings, Luer‐lock one-way valve, an illustrated checklist, and a data collection card. Numerous studies support the efficacy of the ESM-UBT in controlling refractory postpartum hemorrhage, and it has been endorsed by the International Federation of Gynecology and Obstetrics (FIGO) as second-line management for postpartum hemorrhage.

The device is available under the trade name Dr. Burke's ESM-UBT Kit in India and Nepal.

=== Bakri ===
The Bakri balloon is a medical device invented by Dr. Younes Bakri. It features a 24 French, 54 cm-long, silicone catheter with a filling capacity of 500 mL. It has been shown to be an effective means of controlling postpartum hemorrhage.

=== Ellavi ===
The Ellavi balloon is a medical device developed by PATH and Sinapi biomedical It was also designed to be used in low-resource settings, and features a supply bag that provides vertical filling pressure of the balloon. The Ellavi UBT is free flow pressure controlled uterine balloon that allows intrauterine balloon pressure control by adjusting the height of the supply bag and allows water to be expelled from the balloon when the uterus contracts. Two case series were conducted to assess feasibility and acceptance of physicians and midwives using the Ellavi UBT.

== Global usage ==
Postpartum hemorrhage is the leading cause of maternal mortality worldwide In low-resource settings, timely access to surgical facilities may be limited by transport time to tertiary care. Uterine balloon tamponade provides a necessary option to tamponade bleeding while transport occurs to higher levels of care. In addition, UBT can treat severe postpartum hemorrhage and avoid the need for surgical intervention entirely. The ESM-UBT, developed by the Vayu Global Health Foundation, has been shown to be a cost-effective and clinically effective means of treating refractory postpartum hemorrhage in low-resource settings.
