= B-Lynch suture =

Compression suture used in obstetrics

A diagramatic representation of the B-Lynch Brace suture

The B-Lynch suture or B-Lynch procedure is a form of compression suture used in obstetrics. It is used to mechanically compress an atonic uterus in the face of severe postpartum hemorrhage. It was developed by Christopher B-Lynch, a consultant obstetrician and gynaecological surgeon based at Milton Keynes General Hospital, Milton Keynes, Buckinghamshire, England. B-Lynch was born in 1947 in Sierra Leone with the birth name of Christopher Balogun-Lynch.

The technique was first described in 1997. It can stop postpartum hemorrhage without the need for pelvic surgery and potentially preserving fertility. It is regarded as "the best form of surgical approach for controlling atonic PPH as it helps in preserving the anatomical integrity of the uterus."

Absorbable suture can be left in situ, and would typically not lead to problems with future pregnancies.
