= Pelvic massage =

Former gynecological treatment

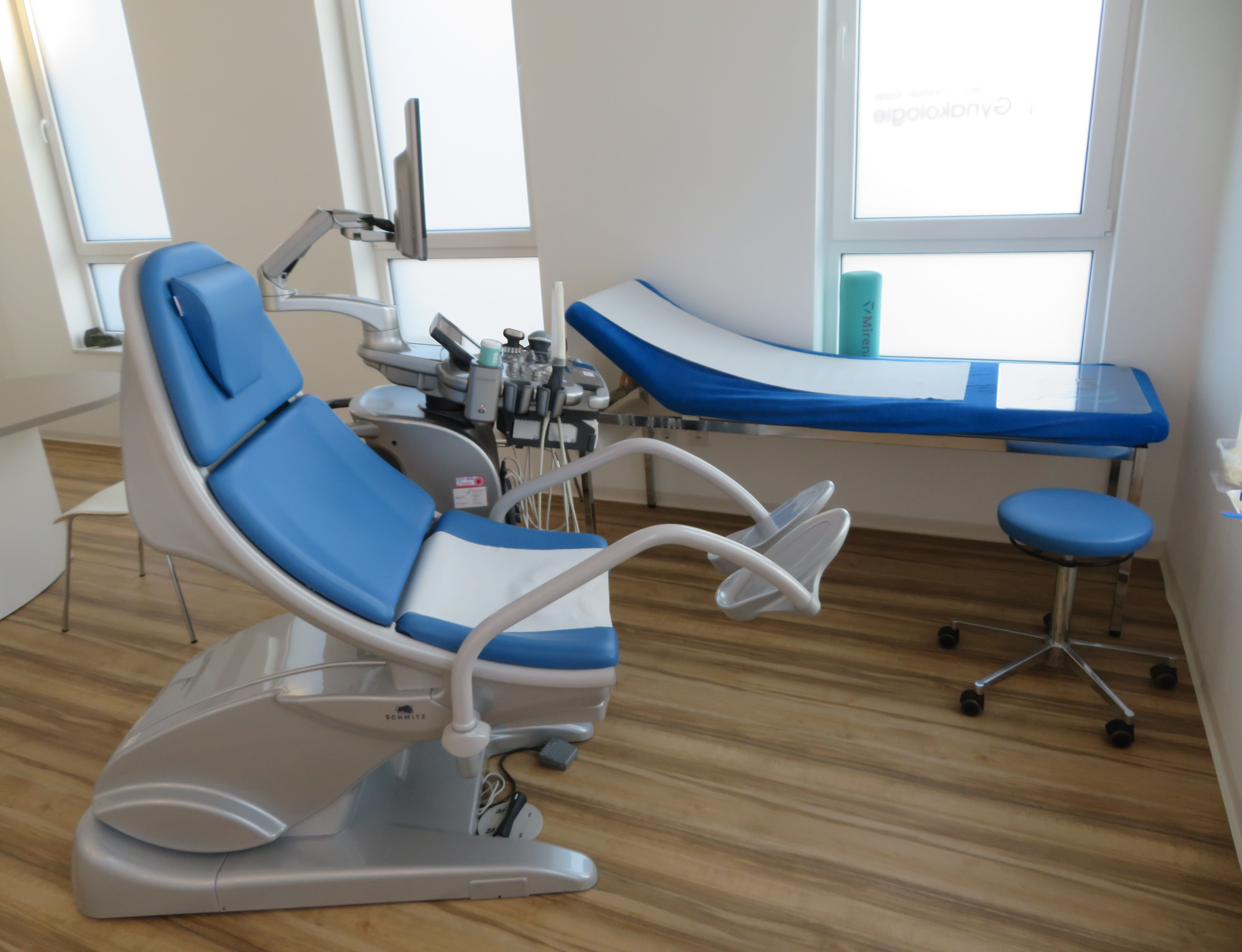
Chair for gynaecological examinations

Pelvic massage was a gynecological treatment first recorded as being used by doctors in the 19th century. An early practitioner was the Swedish Major Thure Brandt (1819–1895), whose method was described in the New York Medical Journal and the Journal of the American Medical Association.

Brandt had been developing his method since the 1860s, and after having a breakthrough in 1886, the method was disseminated in the Baltic Sea region, Germany, and to the world, including to the United States.

== History ==
The method was based upon an old holistic theory of women's physiology: the uterus was seen as a hub of network of nerves in the female body from which illness was disseminated throughout the body, especially if the uterus was somehow displaced. The pelvic massage restored the uterus to its proper place and thus the typical women's complaints, like headaches, backaches, fatigue, depression and such, were cured. The doctor or therapist put his or her finger in the vagina of the patient and simultaneously massaged the uterus from the outside with the other hand. Sometimes the massage was actually carried out by a female assistant of the male physician or physiotherapist, but her participation in the process was usually not mentioned in medical writings and the male practitioner was cited as the sole expert on the method instead.

Contrary to what Rachel Maines claimed in her book The Technology of Orgasm, many practitioners of this massage were aware of the possibility of a sexual stimulation during the procedure and, like the Finnish physician Georg Asp (1834–1901), made it clear that the sexual excitation shall be circumvented and the clitoris studiously avoided.

The pelvic massage disappeared from gynecology during the 1920s. One important reason to that was the influence of early psychoanalysis: the locus of women's pathological issues was moved from the uterus to the neurotic brain, and they were now seen as psychological, not physiological ailments.

== See also ==
- Female hysteria
- Uterine massage

== Literature ==
- Brandt, Thure (1884). Gymnastiken såsom botemedel mot qvinliga underlifssjukdomar jemte strödda anteckningar i allmän sjukgymnastik (in Swedish). Stockholm: Alb. Bonnier.
- Schultze, B. L. (1878). The Pathology and Treatment of Displacement of the Uterus. Translated by J. J. Macan. Chicago: A. C. McClurg.
