= Carboprost =

Chemical compound

Clinical data
- Trade names: Hemabate
- AHFS/Drugs.com: Micromedex Detailed Consumer Information
- MedlinePlus: a600042
- Pregnancy category: AU: D
- Routes of administration: Intramuscular
- ATC code: G02AD04 (WHO)

Legal status
- Legal status: AU: S4 (Prescription only); In general: ℞ (Prescription only)

Identifiers
- IUPAC name: (5Z,9α,11α,13E,15S)-9,11,15-trihydroxy-15- methylprosta-5,13-dien-1-oic acid
- CAS Number: 35700-23-3; tromethamine : 58551-69-2
- PubChem CID: 5281075
- DrugBank: DB00429
- ChemSpider: 4444532
- UNII: 7B5032XT6O; tromethamine : U4526F86FJ
- KEGG: D02343
- ChEBI: CHEBI:3403
- ChEMBL: ChEMBL1237122
- CompTox Dashboard (EPA): DTXSID4022739

Chemical and physical data
- Formula: C_{21}H_{36}O_{5}
- Molar mass: 368.514 g·mol^{−1}
- 3D model (JSmol): Interactive image
- SMILES: O=C(O)CCC/C=C/C[C@H]1[C@@H](O)C[C@@H](O)[C@@H]1/C=C/[C@](O)(C)CCCCC
- InChI: InChI=1S/C21H36O5/c1-3-4-9-13-21(2,26)14-12-17-16(18(22)15-19(17)23)10-7-5-6-8-11-20(24)25/h5,7,12,14,16-19,22-23,26H,3-4,6,8-11,13,15H2,1-2H3,(H,24,25)/b7-5-,14-12+/t16-,17-,18+,19-,21+/m1/s1; Key:DLJKPYFALUEJCK-IIELGFQLSA-N

Carboprost (INN, trade names for the tromethamine salts Hemabate, Tham) is a synthetic prostaglandin analogue of PGF_{2α} (specifically, it is 15-methyl-PGF_{2α}) with oxytocic properties.

Carboprost's main use is to reduce postpartum bleeding during the obstetrical emergency of postpartum hemorrhage.

== Indication ==
Carboprost is used in postpartum hemorrhage caused by uterine atony not controlled by other methods. One study has shown that carboprost tromethamine is more effective than oxytocin in preventing postpartum hemorrhage in high-risk patients undergoing cesarean delivery.

Carboprost was the first drug widely used for medication abortions. It is still sometimes used for second trimester abortions, but has generally been supplanted by the mifepristone/misoprostol combination.

== Contraindication ==
Carboprost is contraindicated in severe cardiovascular, renal, and hepatic disease. It is also contraindicated in acute pelvic inflammatory disease. Hypersensitivity to carboprost or any of its components is also a contraindication.

== Precautions ==
- asthma
- anemia
- jaundice
- diabetes mellitus
- seizure disorders
- past uterine surgery

== Adverse effects ==
- diarrhea (most common, may be sudden in onset)
- flushing or hot flashes
- fever
- chills
- nausea/vomiting

== Storage and availability ==
Carboprost is supplied with its salt derivative tromethamine in 1-milliliter ampules containing a 250 mcg/mL solution of the active drug. The drug must be kept refrigerated at 2–8 °C (36–46 °F).

== Synthesis ==
A significant deactivating metabolic transformation of natural prostaglandins is enzymatic oxidation of the C-15 hydroxyl to the corresponding ketone. This is prevented, with retention of activity, by methylation to give the C-15 tertiary carbinol series.

Carboprost synthesis:; G. L. Bundy, U.S. patent 3,728,382 (1973 to Upjohn).

This molecular feature is readily introduced at the stage of the Corey lactone (1) by reaction with methyl Grignard reagent or trimethylaluminium. The resulting mixture of tertiary carbinols (2) is transformed to oxytocic carboprost (3) by standard transformations, including separation of diastereomers, so that the final product is the C-15 analogue. This diastereomer is reputably freeer of prostaglandin side effects than the C-15 (S) isomer.
