= Sengstaken–Blakemore tube =

Medical device

- Diagram of a Sengstaken-Blakemore tube in use. There are sphygmomanometer drains connected with esophageal port, to enable inflating the balloon with correct pressure.
- ICD-9-CM: 96.06

A Sengstaken–Blakemore tube is a medical device inserted through the nose or mouth and used occasionally in the management of upper gastrointestinal hemorrhage due to esophageal varices (distended and fragile veins in the esophageal wall, usually a result of cirrhosis). The use of the tube was originally described in 1950, although similar approaches to bleeding varices were described by Westphal in 1930. With the advent of modern endoscopic techniques which can rapidly and definitively control variceal bleeding, Sengstaken–Blakemore tubes are rarely used at present.

== Device ==
Diagram of a Minnesota tube (a similar device to the Sengstaken–Blakemore tube, but with four lumens)

The device consists of a flexible plastic tube containing several internal channels and two inflatable balloons. Apart from the balloons, the tube has an opening at the bottom (gastric tip) of the device. More modern models also have an opening near the upper esophagus; such devices are properly termed Minnesota tubes. The tube is passed down into the esophagus and the gastric balloon is inflated inside the stomach. A traction of 1 kg is applied to the tube so that the gastric balloon will compress the gastroesophageal junction and reduce the blood flow to esophageal varices. If the use of traction alone cannot stop the bleeding, the esophageal balloon is also inflated to help stop the bleeding. The esophageal balloon should not remain inflated for more than six hours, to avoid necrosis. The gastric lumen is used to aspirate stomach contents.

Generally, Sengstaken–Blakemore tubes and Minnesota tubes are used only in emergencies where bleeding from presumed varices is impossible to control with medication alone. The tube may be difficult to position, particularly in an unwell patient, and may inadvertently be inserted in the trachea, hence endotracheal intubation before the procedure is strongly advised to secure the airway. The tube is often kept in the refrigerator in the hospital's emergency department, intensive care unit and gastroenterology ward. It is a temporary measure: ulceration and rupture of the esophagus and stomach are recognized complications.

A related device with a larger gastric balloon capacity (about 500 ml), the Linton–Nachlas tube, is used for bleeding gastric varices. It does not have an esophageal balloon.

== Eponym ==
It is named after Robert William Sengstaken Sr. (1923–1978), an American neurosurgeon, and Arthur Blakemore (1897–1970), an American vascular surgeon. They conceptualized and invented the tube in the early 1950s.

== See also ==
Bakri balloon
