= Obstetrical bleeding =

Bleeding in pregnancy that occurs before, during, or after childbirth

- Other names: Maternal bleeding, obstetrical hemorrhage, obstetric haemorrhage, maternal hemorrhage
- Specialty: Obstetrics
- Frequency: 8.7 million (2015)
- Deaths: 83,000 (2015)

Obstetrical bleeding is bleeding in pregnancy that occurs before, during, or after childbirth. Bleeding before childbirth is that which occurs after 24 weeks of pregnancy. Bleeding may be vaginal or, less commonly, into the abdominal cavity. Bleeding that occurs before 24 weeks is known as early pregnancy bleeding.

Causes of bleeding before and during childbirth include cervicitis, placenta previa, placental abruption and uterine rupture. Causes of bleeding after childbirth include poor contraction of the uterus, retained products of conception, and bleeding disorders.

About 8.7 million cases of severe maternal bleeding occurred in 2015 resulting in 83,000 deaths. Between 2003 and 2009, bleeding accounted for 27% of maternal deaths globally.

== Later pregnancy ==
Antepartum bleeding (APH), also prepartum hemorrhage, is bleeding during pregnancy from the 24th week (sometimes defined as from the 20th week) gestational age up to the birth of the baby. The primary consideration is the presence of a placenta previa, which is a low-lying placenta at or very near to the internal cervical os. This condition occurs in roughly 4 out of 1000 pregnancies and usually needs to be resolved by delivering the baby via cesarean section. Also, a placental abruption (in which there is premature separation of the placenta) can lead to obstetrical hemorrhage, sometimes concealed. This pathology is of important consideration after maternal trauma, such as a motor vehicle accident or fall.

Other considerations to include when assessing antepartum bleeding are: sterile vaginal exams that are performed to assess dilation of the patient when the 40th week is approaching. Cervical insufficiency is defined as a midtrimester (14th-26th week) dilation of the cervix, which may need medical intervention to assist in keeping the pregnancy sustainable.

=== During labor ===
Besides placenta previa and placental abruption, uterine rupture can occur, which is a very serious condition leading to internal or external bleeding. Bleeding from the fetus is rare, but may occur with two conditions called vasa previa and velamentous umbilical cord insertion, where the fetal blood vessels lie near the placental insertion site unprotected by Wharton's jelly of the cord. Occasionally this condition can be diagnosed by ultrasound. There are also tests to differentiate maternal blood from fetal blood, which can help in determining the source of the bleed.

== After delivery ==
Abnormal bleeding after delivery, or postpartum hemorrhage, is the loss of greater than 500 ml of blood following vaginal delivery, or 1000 ml of blood following cesarean section. Other definitions of excessive postpartum bleeding are hemodynamic instability, drop of hemoglobin of more than 10%, or requiring blood transfusion. In the literature, primary postpartum hemorrhage is defined as uncontrolled bleeding that occurs in the first 24 hours after delivery, while secondary hemorrhage occurs between 24 hours and six weeks.

== Risk factors ==
In rare cases, inherited bleeding disorders, like hemophilia, von Willebrand disease (vWD), or factor IX or XI deficiency, may cause severe postpartum hemorrhage, with an increased risk of death, particularly in the postpartum period. The risk of postpartum hemorrhage in patients with vWD and carriers of hemophilia is 18.5% and 22%, respectively. This pathology occurs due to the normal physiological drop in maternal clotting factors after delivery, which greatly increases the risk of secondary postpartum hemorrhage. Another bleeding risk factor is thrombocytopenia, or decreased platelet levels, which is the most common hematological change associated with pregnancy-induced hypertension. If platelet counts drop less than 100,000 per microliter, the patient will be at a severe risk for inability to clot during and after delivery.

== Medical tests ==
If a small amount of bleeding is seen in early pregnancy, a physician may request:

- A quantitative human chorionic gonadotropin (hCG) blood test to confirm the pregnancy or assist in diagnosing a potential miscarriage
- Transvaginal pelvic ultrasonography to confirm that the pregnancy is not outside of the uterus
- Blood type and Rh test to rule out hemolytic disease of the newborn

For bleeding seen in later pregnancy tests may include:

- Complete blood count (CBC) and blood type and screen
- Ultrasound to determine placental location
- Kleihauer-Betke (KB) test, especially if there was maternal trauma

== Unrelated bleeding ==
Pregnant patients may have bleeding from the reproductive tract due to trauma, including sexual trauma, neoplasm, most commonly cervical cancer, and hematologic disorders. Molar pregnancy (also called hydatiform mole) is a type of pregnancy where the sperm and the egg have joined within the uterus, but the result is a cyst resembling a grape-like cluster rather than an embryo. Bleeding can be an early sign of this tumor developing.

== See also ==
- Gynecologic bleeding
- Non-pneumatic anti-shock garment
