= Bakri balloon =

Medical device

A drawing of a Bakri balloon placed in the uterus

The Bakri balloon is a medical device invented and designed by Younes Noaman Bakri in 1999.

The obstetrical balloon is a 24 French, 54 cm-long, silicone catheter with a filling capacity of 500 mL. The device is used for the temporary control and reduction of postpartum hemorrhage (PPH).

Around 100,000 maternal deaths occur every year from PPH and is the leading cause of maternal mortality in the developed world.

== Uses ==
The Bakri balloon is a silicone, obstetrical balloon specifically designed to treat postpartum hemorrhage (PPH). The device is used for the "temporary control or reduction of postpartum hemorrhage when conservative management of uterine bleeding is warranted."

Novel uses of the Bakri Balloon have been reported in the treatment of Empty Pelvis Syndrome (EPS), Gestational Trophoblastic Neoplasia (GTN) and uterine atony.

Collaborative research published in the British Journal of Surgery identified the Bakri Balloon as one of the devices used in mitigation strategies for EPS

Soheila Aminimoghaddam et al. described an efficient method in preventing EPS by placing the Bakri Balloon in the pelvic cavity after exenteration. The results showed the balloon was a useful tool in providing "a physical barrier to prevent the descending of intestinal loops and a breeding ground for reconstruction of the pelvic floor".

Between December 2019 and May 2022, Mufaddal Kazi et al. used the Bakri Balloon on 75 patients in a study to determine its efficacy in preventing EPS. They reported no complications. Although a larger comparative study was needed, deploying the Bakri Balloon was considered a safe method following pelvic exenteration.

The Bakri Balloon was also seen as a "simple, safe and cost-effective method" to reduce EPS complications by S Bankar et al. when combined with other surgical techniques.

The Bakri Balloon as a life saving technique to treat Gestational Trophoblastic Neoplasia (GTN) lesions was described by BG Goldman et al. after other attempts at managing GTN led to catastrophic bleeding and patient instability. Their recommendations included the balloon as a primary method for treatment.

Zurich University Hospital used a modified Bakri balloon to treat 66 patients with uterine atony from March 2017 until June 2020 for vacuum-induced hemorrhage control. Christian Haslinger et al. connected the balloon to a vacuum device and applied 60–70 kPa vacuum. Their findings showed a success rate of 86%.

== Cases ==
One study in Finland involving 50 patients recorded an overall success rate of 86% when using the Bakri balloon in managing PPH. A German study involving 20 patients cited an overall success rate of 90% when the balloon is used in combination with B-Lynch sutures.

In 2023, a 4-year case study (2016–2020) in China involving 279 women was published and concluded that the Bakri balloon was an effective treatment in controlling postpartum hemorrhage. The overall success rate was 88.89% and supported those from previous studies.

== Endorsements ==
Both the International Federation of Gynaecology and Obstetrics (FIGO) and the International Confederation of Midwives (ICM) have approved the balloon as one of the primary support tools in treating PPH.

In 2021, the World Health Organization recommended the Bakri Balloon as part of its guidelines to help reduce the maternal mortality ratio to less than 70 per 100,000 live births by 2030.

== See also ==
- Maternal death
