= Victor Bonney =

British gynecological surgeon (1872–1953)

Victor Bonney FRCS FRCP
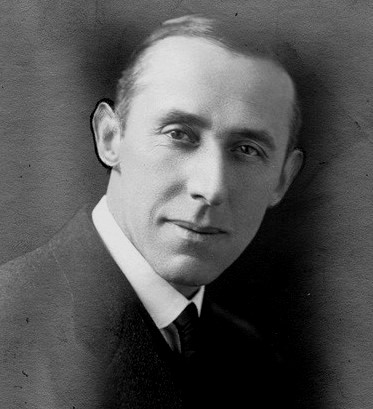
- Victor Bonney, 1922
- Born: William Francis Victor Bonney; 17 December 1872
- Died: 4 July 1953 (aged 80); Chelsea
- Education: St Bartholomew's Hospital; Middlesex Hospital
- Known for: "Bonney's blue" antiseptic; Mastering Wertheim's hysterectomy; Myomectomy; Ovarian cystectomy; Bonney's myomectomy clamp; Modifying the Reverdin needle
- Medical career
- Profession: Surgeon
- Field: Gynaecology
- Sub-specialties: Gynaecological surgery
- Notable works: Bonney's Gynaecological Surgery

William Francis Victor Bonney FRCP FRCS (17 December 1872 – 4 July 1953) was a prominent British gynaecological surgeon. He was described by Geoffrey Chamberlain as "a primary influence on world gynaecology in the years between the wars".

Bonney is primarily remembered for the invention of an antiseptic solution known as "Bonney's blue", used to sterilise and stain the vagina, cervix and surrounding skin during gynaecological procedures, and therefore reducing post-operative infection. He became experienced in the radical extended Wertheim hysterectomy for treating cervical cancer, performing more than 500 of these in his lifetime.

Personal tragedy directed Bonney towards conservative surgery and he became a pioneer in the field of the less drastic procedures of ovarian cystectomy for removing ovarian cysts and the myomectomy for removing uterine fibroids. Its preference over hysterectomy preserved the fertility of many women of reproductive age. He developed a surgical clamp to reduce post-myomectomy haemorrhage, established operative techniques to reduce post-operative haematomas and modified the Reverdin needle.

In addition, he wrote more than 200 medical papers and co-authored and illustrated A Textbook of Gynaecological Surgery (1911), still in print in 2004 as Bonney's Gynaecological Surgery.

== Early life and education ==
Victor Bonney was born on 17 December 1872 at Chelsea. He was the eldest son of William Augustus Bonney, a physician, and Anna Maria Alice Polixene. Both his father and paternal grandfather were medical practitioners. He received his basic education at a private school.

Bonney was trained at St Bartholomew's Hospital but transferred to the Middlesex Hospital, with his intention to become a physician. Sir John Bland-Sutton then invited him to the Chelsea Hospital for Women, where he became a gynaecologist. He was awarded with MBBS in 1896, and MD two years later. In 1899, he was awarded with the Master of Surgery and subsequently became a fellow of the Royal College of Surgeons in 1899. He was accepted as a fellow of the Royal College of Physicians the following year.

== Early surgical training ==
In 1901 he was an assistant physician and held residential posts at Queen Charlotte's Hospital, the Middlesex Hospital and Chelsea hospitals. Subsequently, he studied anatomy at London University and achieved a BSc with first-class honours in 1904. A year later, he became obstetric registrar and tutor at the Middlesex and in 1908 he was elected assistant gynaecological surgeon.

== Surgical career ==
Bonney, subsequently spent the next four decades developing techniques in gynaecological cancer surgery, operations that conserved fertility, antiseptic techniques, after care of the bowel following pelvic surgery and advocating Lower segment Caesarean section as an alternative to traditional caesarian section. He was acknowledged for his speed and utilised two chauffeur driven cars when travelling to perform surgery in peoples private homes and nursing homes, with one car transporting the operating equipment ahead of his arrival. He also had his own operating clothing which was washed at home. His surgical operations were not merely confined to the pelvis; gynaecologist and historian, professor Geoffrey Chamberlain, reported in his biography of Bonney in 2000 that Bonney had also performed fourteen breast removals, eight gallbladder excisions and five varicose vein resections.

Bonney also had the experience, with his colleague Berkeley, of operating on thousands of wounded soldiers who arrived at Clacton, Essex throughout the First World War, procedures including extracting bullets, and shrapnel. Chamberlain also later described Bonney as "a primary influence on world gynaecology in the years between the wars".

=== Lower-segment caesarian section ===
His early work was on the causes of puerperal fever and techniques in caesarean section, being one of the first to advocate the delivery of babies through the lower segment of the caesarean section. This brought down the mortality and infection rates of caesarean deliveries. He regarded the traditional caesarean section as bloody and when he gave the Bradshaw lecture in 1934, he referred to it as a "smash and grab raid". He endorsed the lower segment caesarean section and prevented excessive bleeding by making use of his uterine compresser.

=== Gynaecological cancers ===
He was a pioneer figure in the domain of cervical cancer and commanded immense fame in the radical procedure of Wertheim hysterectomy, performing 500 of these in the course of his career.

Having previously watched Ernst Wertheim, Bonney achieved an initial mortality rate of 14%. This was before blood transfusions, chemotherapy, antibiotics and radiotherapy and with only early anaesthetics and little understanding of water and electrolyte balance. Complications of Wertheim's hysterectomy included bowel, bladder and ureteric damage. The procedure later declined particularly after the advent of radiotherapy for use in cervical cancer in the late 1930s. Blood transfusions were relevant only in the last 100 of his Wertheim hysterectomies. The procedure was later improved by Joe Vincent Meigs, after he visited Bonney in 1933 and who also commended Bonney for his work.

In 1949, Bonney reported a 40% cure rate from his Wertheim's hysterectomies.

=== Organ-preservation ===
Bonney was a strong proponent for organ-conservation, including preserving the ovaries using techniques in ovarian cystectomy in the case of ovarian cysts and played a pioneer role in the reintroduction of myomectomy-procedures to mainstream surgery in place of radical hysterectomy. At a time, when myomectomies fell out of favour due to the associated blood loss, post-operative haematomas and frequent post-operative infections, he developed an ingenious surgical clamp, the "Bonney myomectomy clamp", to temporarily halt the blood supply of the uterus during the operation. It allowed the shelling out of the uterine fibroids while still preserving the fertility of women of reproductive age, thus giving them a chance to have children later on.

Bonney's first myomectomy was recorded in 1913, when he successfully removed six fibroids from the uterus of a 30‐year‐old nulliparous woman. He went on to perform over 700 myomectomies across his career-span. With a death-rate of around 1.1% and around 38% of the patients being able to bear children, they were highly successful. In 1934, he made it clear that he "strenuously advocated myomectomy in preference to hysterectomy in all those cases in which the removal of the uterus is liable to be followed by undesirable psychological effects."

=== Post-operative bowel obstruction ===
As a consequence of his wife's experience with gynaecological procedures, Bonney took interest in a number of surgical scenarios including the functioning of bowel after major surgery.

The subject of intestinal drainage in bowel obstruction and peritonitis was later much discussed as a result of the work of Bonney in 1910.

=== Bonney's blue ===
He established a skin-procedure to provide a sterile area for gynaecological procedures. During the First World War and his time as a surgeon to the military branch of the Middlesex Hospital and at the County of London and Royal Masonic Hospitals, with bacteriologist C. H. Browning, he developed an antiseptic, a 1% solution in 50% alcohol from equal parts of crystal violet and brilliant green. This was used to sterilise and stain the vagina, the outer surface of the cervix and the body from breast to mid-thigh prior to the gynaecological procedures.

It has since been known as "Bonney's blue" and its use in staining and dyeing has continued and has been shown to be an effective antiseptic solution for generic purposes. He later described how the staining of the vagina with his solution "is a great advantage when – as, for instance, in total hysterectomy – that canal has to be opened from above, for the deep coloration defines it very clearly."

=== Other surgical instruments ===
Bonney modified the Reverdin needle. Other instruments attributed to Bonney include Bonney's round ligament forceps and the Bonney's vaginal clamp.

== Surgical writing ==
Bonney's most significant books were the Textbook of Gynaecological Surgery (1911) with Comyns Berkeley and The Technical Minutiae of extended Myomectomy and Ovarian Cystectomy (1946). He took lessons at a drawing school in order to learn how to produce the illustrations for each and contributed 611 drawings to the Textbook and 242 to The Technical Minutiae. His Textbook was still in print in 2004, in its 10th edition, as Bonney's Gynaecological Surgery with new editors and authors. The authors observed, in the introduction to that edition, that the work retained Bonney's philosophy and the first chapter was almost as Bonney originally wrote it because it had not dated since 1911.

== Other appointments ==
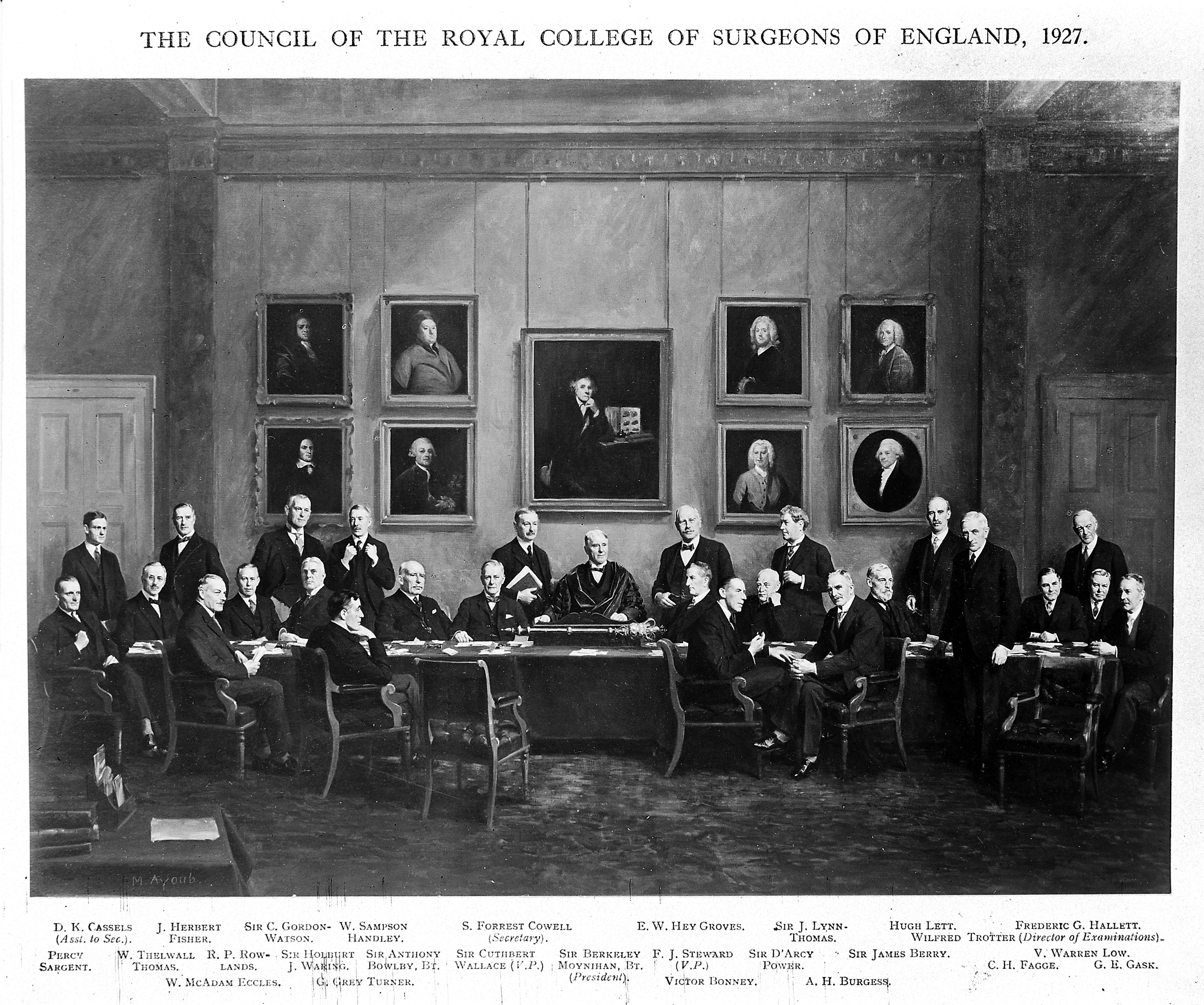
Group Portrait, Council of the Royal College of Surgeons (1927). Includes Victor Bonney.

He was elected as the vice-president of the Royal College of Surgeons and vociferously objected to the formation of the Royal College of Obstetricians and Gynaecologists (RCOG), with the opinion that obstetricians and gynaecologists were surgeons too.

He was also the first honorary fellow of the Royal Australasian College of Surgeons and an honorary fellow of the Association of Surgeons, the American Gynaecological Society, and did eventually become an honorary fellow of the RCOG.

== Personal life ==
Bonney was an accomplished baritone and was also a skilled salmon-fisherman. He shared a lifelong friendship with Rudyard Kipling. He also kept Pekingese dogs.

Bonney met his future wife Annie, while he was a resident and she was a sister at the Chelsea Hospital for Women in London. They married in May 1905. Two years later, Annie suffered from very heavy periods which in turn resulted in severe anaemia and was corrected by a hysterectomy, thus preventing her having children. This setback led to Bonney's lifelong advocacy for the more conservative surgery of myomectomy over the more radical hysterectomy, arguing that "Since cure without deformity or loss of function must ever be surgery's highest ideal, the general proposition that myomectomy is a greater surgical achievement than hysterectomy is incontestable." It is believed that she had submucous fibroids. The bowel obstruction she experienced ten days after her hysterectomy led Bonney to also research bowel function after surgery.

== Death and legacy ==
Bonney died in the Middlesex Hospital on 4 July 1953, aged 81. In 1956 his wife gave the Royal College of Surgeons the portrait of Bonney painted by Oswald Birley. The college also holds three bound volumes of his published papers and his autobiography, which he donated to them.

== Selected publications ==
Bonney wrote more than two hundred medical articles and a number of books:

=== Articles ===
- Berkeley, C; Bonney, V (1908). "On the Radical Abdominal Operation for Carcinoma of the Cervix ("Wertheim's"), with Notes of Eighteen Cases, of Which Sixteen Were Too Advanced for Vaginal Hysterectomy". Br Med J. 2 (2492): 961–7. doi:10.1136/bmj.2.2492.961. PMC 2437524. PMID 20764072.
- Bonney, V (1919). "The Continued High Maternal Mortality of Child-bearing: The Reason and the Remedy". Proc R Soc Med. 12 (Obstet Gynaecol Sect): 75–107. doi:10.1177/003591571901200926. PMC 2067035. PMID 19980625.
- Bonney, V (1923). "The Scope and Technique of Myomectomy: (Abstract)". Proc R Soc Med. 16 (Obstet Gynaecol Sect): 22–4. doi:10.1177/003591572301601004. PMC 2103496. PMID 19983111.
- Bonney, Victor (1917). "On the Sole Use of Reverdin's Needle". The Lancet. 189 (4896): 994–996. doi:10.1016/S0140-6736(01)28955-7.
- Bonney, Victor (1931). "The Technique and Results of Myomectomy". The Lancet. 217 (5604): 171–177. doi:10.1016/S0140-6736(00)40479-4.
- "The Standardised Reverdin Needle Holder", The Journal of Obstetrics and Gynaecology of the British Empire, 1931, Volume 38, Issue 3.

=== Books ===
- A Textbook of Gynaecological Surgery. Cassell, London, 1911. (With Comyns Berkeley)
- The Difficulties and Emergencies of Obstetric Practice. Churchill, London, 1913. (With Comyns Berkeley)
- A Guide to Gynaecology in General Practice. Churchill, London, 1914. (With Comyns Berkeley)
- The Annals of the Middlesex Hospital at Clacton-on-Sea, 1914–1919. London, 1921. (With Comyns Berkeley)
- Cancer of the Uterus. Postgraduate Lectures. Bale, Son and Danielson, 1925.
- The Technique of Myomectomy. 1936.
- The Abnormal in Obstetrics. Edward Arnold, London, 1938. (With Comyns Berkeley and Douglas Macleod)
- The Technical Minutiae of Extended Myomectomy and Ovarian Cystectomy. Cassell, London, 1946.
