= John Stallworthy (obstetrician) =

New Zealand-born British obstetrician (1906–1993)

Sir John Arthur Stallworthy (26 July 1906 – 19 November 1993) was a New Zealand-born British obstetrician who was Nuffield Professor of Obstetrics and Gynaecology at the University of Oxford from 1967 to 1973.

== Early life and education ==
Stallworthy was born in Auckland in 1906. His father was Arthur Stallworthy, who later became member of parliament for the Eden electorate (1928–1935). His grandfather, John Stallworthy, was member of parliament for the Kaipara electorate (1905–1911). His brother was psychiatrist Dr K.R. Stallworthy. Stallworthy received his education at Auckland Grammar School and won a scholarship to Auckland University College, where he studied law and medicine. He decided to proceed with medicine and went to the University of Otago. He graduated with an MBChB in 1931 with distinction in surgery, obstetrics and gynaecology.

== Career ==
After working as a house surgeon at Auckland Hospital Stallworthy was awarded two travelling fellowships in 1931 and 1932 which enabled him to work and study for the next six years in Melbourne, in London under Victor Bonney and in Vienna. In 1938 he was invited by Professor Chassar Moir to be first assistant in the Department of Obstetrics and Gynaecology at Oxford University. The following year he took charge of a department at the Radcliffe Infirmary. Also in 1939 he was invited by Farquhar Buzzard, the Regius Professor of Medicine at Oxford to establish an area department based at Radcliffe which would bring together general practitioners, midwives and hospital consultants working in obstetrics and gynaecology across Oxford hospitals. When Moir retired in 1967 he succeeded him as Nuffield Professor of Obstetrics and Gynaecology. He retired in 1973.

Concerns about maternal mortality was a catalyst for Stallworthy to set up a service known as the 'obstetric flying squad' during the war. Visits by care teams to patients' homes significantly reduced maternal deaths. His achievements were in the treatment of cancer of the cervix by radiotherapy and Wertheim's hysterectomy and conservative management of pelvic tuberculosis. The treatment of cervical cancer was the topic of his Hunterian Lecture given to the Royal College of Surgeons of England in 1963.

== Other appointments ==
Stallworthy held a number of positions in the wider medical world. He was president of the Medical Protection Society from 1969 to 1976 and of the British Medical Association (BMA) in 1975. He twice served as president of the Royal Society of Medicine, firstly from 1973 to 1975 and secondly from 1980 to 1982. From 1981 to 1983 he chaired the BMA Working Party on the Medical Effects of Nuclear War.

== Honours and awards ==
He was knighted in 1972 for services to medicine. In 1975 the University of Otago and the University of Leeds awarded him honorary DScs. The British Medical Association awarded him its gold medal in 1981.

== Personal life ==
Stallworthy married Margaret Howe in 1936. They had two daughters and one son Jon Stallworthy, biographer, literary critic and Professor of English Literature at Oxford University. His other interests were driving fast cars, writing and gardening.

He died in Oxford of a heart attack on 19 November 1993.
