= Reverdin =

Reverdin is a French surname. Notable people with this surname include:

- Jacques-Louis Reverdin, Swiss surgeon
- Louis Reverdin (1894-?), phycologist with the standard author abbreviation 'Reverdin'
- Mathieu Reverdin, French ice hockey player
