= Lambeth Hospital (Brook Drive) =

- Lambeth Board of Guardians 1876- 1930, London County Council 1930-1948, Lambeth Hospital Group (NHS) 1948-1968 , St. Thomas' Hospital (NHS) 1968-1976.

Geography
- Location: Brook Drive , Kennington, London, SE11, United Kingdom

Organisation
- Type: General

History
- Former name: Lambeth Infirmary
- Opened: 1876
- Closed: 1976

Links
- Lists: Hospitals in the United Kingdom

Lambeth Hospital, Brook Drive, Kennington, London, SE11 provided general medical services from 1876 until its closure in 1976.

== Origins ==
Lambeth Hospital had its origins in two institutions both built and administered by Lambeth Board of Guardians. These were Renfrew Road Workhouse opened in 1871 and Lambeth Infirmary, opened in 1876 on an adjoining site, with its main entrance in Brook Drive. The two institutions were amalgamated under the medical superintendent and matron of the infirmary and named Lambeth Hospital in 1922.

The Lambeth Infirmary was noted for the development of radium treatment for cancer under Dr George Stebbing, the training of nurses and midwives under Matron Griffiths and then Matron Byles at a time when workhouse infirmaries were generally staffed by inmates, as well as building modern accommodation for nurses. Matron Byles received an OBE for services during World War One at the infirmary.

== 1922–1948 ==
Under the administration of the Lambeth Board of Guardians the hospital had two observation wards (part of the municipal authorities' responsibilities under the Lunacy Acts), venereal disease wards, a lying-in ward (maternity) with an antenatal clinic, weekly sessions by an ophthalmic surgeon, a pathological laboratory and radium and deep x-ray apparatus for the treatment of cancer.

In 1930 the hospital was transferred to the administration of the London County Council (LCC) under the Local Government Act 1929. At the time the Medical Superintendent was Dr A L Baly and the matron Miss WB Woodman. The LCC closed the observation wards (transferring the patients to another hospital), established new Units (a cancer of the uterus unit under Sir Comyns Berkeley and cardiovascular unit under Viscount Dawson of Penn) and developed a radiotherapy service. The LCC built a new Nurses' Home for 200 nurses in 1936. A new maternity block was also built and opened in 1938. By 1939 Lambeth Hospital was one of the three largest municipal hospitals in London with beds for 1250 patients.

=== The Second World War ===
During Second World War the elderly long-term patients were evacuated to other hospitals. The Hospital treated many air-raid casualties and itself suffered severe bomb damage, with ten members of staff killed. The staff deaths included two probationer nurses from Ireland. Margaret McDonnell from Co Antrim Northern Ireland and Helen Franklin from Co Sligo RoI. Both were buried in Lambeth Cemetery Wandsworth.

Two ward blocks were destroyed and three others badly damaged resulting in a reduction of beds to 518.

== 1948–1976 ==
With the inception of the National Health Service in 1948, Lambeth Hospital was administered by The Lambeth Group Hospital Management Committee, along with the South London Hospital for Women and Children, Annie McCall Maternity Hospital and the South Western Hospital. The Hospital Management Committee reported to the South West Metropolitan Regional Hospital Board. The Lambeth Group was enlarged by the addition of the Royal Eye Hospital, Southwark (1956). In July 1964 the Lambeth Group of hospitals was dissolved. Lambeth Hospital became part of the St. Thomas' Hospital Group.

In 1970 Lambeth Hospital was an acute, general hospital with 468 beds. A new twin operating theatre block had been completed in 1967 and a new Renal Unit opened in 1969. In 1968 Lambeth Hospital opened one of 15 outpatient clinics registered in London for the treatment of drug addiction.

The hospital closed in 1976, although the nurses' accommodation was used for some years afterwards.

On part of the site of the hospital in Monkton Street, the Lambeth Community Care Centre was completed in 1985. In the same year another part of the site was used to film Death Wish 3, starring Charles Bronson.

== Notable Patients ==
- James Callaghan, Prime Minister of the United Kingdom (1979–1979), was an inpatient while Shadow Secretary of Employment.
- Tom Costello, music hall comedian, died in 1943 aged 80 in Lambeth Hospital.
- Annie Kenney, militant suffragette, was treated in the hospital after collapsing at a suffragette protest.
