= Comyns Berkeley =

Obstetric physician, gynaecological surgeon and medical writer

Sir Comyns Berkeley
- George Harold Arthur Comyns Berkeley
- Sir Comyns Berkeley taken by James Lafayette of Lafayette Ltd, on 19 August 1929
- Born: 16 October 1865; Notting Hill, London
- Died: 27 November 1946 (aged 81); Middlesex, London
- Resting place: St Marylebone Crematorium, East Finchley
- Education: Gonville and Caius College, Cambridge
- Known for: Co-founding the Royal College of Obstetricians and Gynaecologists, helping to found the Royal College of Nursing
- Spouse: Lady Ethel Berkeley née Rose
- Awards: Knight of the Bath, FRCS, FRCOG, FRCP, Hon MMSA
- Scientific career
- Fields: obstetric and gynaecology
- Workplaces: Middlesex Hospital, City of London Maternity Hospital, Chelsea Hospital for Women

George Harold Arthur Comyns Berkeley KB FRCS FRCOG FRCP (16 October 1865 – 27 January 1946) was an obstetric physician, gynaecological surgeon and medical writer. Berkeley was most notable along with William Blair-Bell and Sir William Sinclair for creating the British College of Obstetricians and Gynaecologists. Berkeley was also noted for his writing collaborations with Victor Bonney, the book A Textbook of Gynaecological Surgery that is still considered a medical classic. It was as teacher that he excelled.

== Early life and education ==
Comyns Berkeley was the eldest son of G. A. Berkeley and Sarah Berkeley née Louisa. G. A. Berkeley was a wine importer and was related to the Earls of Berkley. Berkeley was educated both at Dulwich College and Marlborough College. Berkeley subsequently enrolled for matriculation at Gonville and Caius College, Cambridge where he studied natural science, completing his bachelor's degree in 1887 and achieving a third-class honours in Natural Sciences Tripos Part I.

== Career ==
Berkeley's clinical training was undertaking at Middlesex Hospital in 1888, achieving his MB in 1892. Berkeley's first house appointments were at the Royal Brompton Hospital and the Hospital for Sick Children. In 1895, Berkeley was appointed to the Chelsea Hospital for Women as a registrar and in 1897 was promoted to an assistant surgeon to Sir Henry Morris.

In 1901, Berkeley moved back to Middlesex Hospital with an appointment as an obstetric registrar and tutor. Berkeley remained at Middlesex hospital for a number of years. In 1903 he was elected to the position of obstetric and gynaecological surgeon, i.e. as physician-accoucheur, a midwifery position to William A Duncan. In 1905, he was again promoted by election to the position of gynaecological surgeon in the Midwifery department and then in 1909 Berkley was elected again to a position of being a full member of staff. The importance of surgery and its apparent emphasis was reflected in titles of Berkeley and Booney in 1908, when Berkley took the title of surgeon and Booney took the title of assistant surgeon as opposed to the former physician and assistant physician.

During his career he was also surgeon to City of London Maternity Hospital and the Chelsea Hospital for Women and consulting gynaecological surgeon to hospitals in Hornsey, Eltham and Clacton Hospitals and the London County Council Radium Centre in Lambeth. He was examiner in midwifery and diseases of women to many universities.

=== Surgical career ===
Berkley had a long collaboration with his friend, the surgeon Victor Bonney that started in 1898 when Booney was resident surgical officer, and Berkley was his senior as junior assistant surgeon at Chelsea Hospital for Women. Together they developed an operative treatment for cervical cancer during the first two decades of the 20th century. This collaboration would lead them to proving the Wertheim radical hysterectomy that was used to treat cervical cancer. By 1922, Booney reported that they had performed around 240 Wertlheim's operations.

In 1911–1912, Berkeley and the Middlesex hospital became associated with the use of new compound radium for the treatment of cervical cancer, in the search for treatments using the metal. He established a new clinic at Lambeth Hospital, becoming its director between 1928 and 1939. He had a strong administrative interest in promoting female health as the British representative to the League of Nations commission on radium, promoting reports on radium treatment for cervical cancer. Berkley also worked closely with the Ministry of Health, organising his departments investigation into mortality in childbirth. This produced reports in 1930 and 1932.

=== Nursing and Midwifery ===
Berkeley had significant influence in the nursing and midwifery professions. He was an active supporter of the Royal British Nurses' Association, which was campaigning for the state registration of nurses, from at least 1898. He was their honorary treasurer and was one of their representatives in a deputation to the Prime Minister in support of state registration in 1913. He remained active with the RBNA until c.1916 when his support for the College of Nursing was increasingly seen by RBNA members at being in opposition to them.

He was honorary treasurer of the College of Nursing (later the Royal College of Nursing, RCN) from its inception in 1916 until his death in 1946. He sat on their Council, and was chair of their Financial Committee. He was also treasurer of the Cowdray Club (associated with the RCN). He was similarly supportive of the Royal College of Midwives. He was Chair of the regulatory Central Midwives Board from 1936 and a member of its Council from 1931.

=== Writing career ===
Berkeley was a prolific writer and editor for much of his career. His Handbook for Obstetric Dressers and Midwives reached its thirteenth edition by 1946. Berkeley edited two popular textbooks known as Midwifery by Ten Teachers and Diseases of Women by Ten Teachers. Berkley was also the editor of the Journal of Obstetrics and Gynaecology of the British Empire for over two decades.

== Personal life ==
In April 1894, Berkley married Ethel Berkeley née Rose. Berkley was widely known as a bit of a bon viveur by nature and inheritance, whose dinner parties were considered famous and who was involved in all the social activities of Middlesex Hospital including being prominent along with anaesthetist Herbert Charles at the annual dance. He was physically active and enjoyed hunting, shooting and golfing even though as a child he suffered polio resulting in infantile paralysis of one leg, but it never seemed to reduce his activity. Indeed, it was on a shooting trip that the idea for the formation of the RCOG was first gained life.

On 27 January 1946, Berkley died in hospital where he spent most of his working life. His family buried him at St Marylebone Crematorium.

== Awards and honours ==
In 1909, Berkeley was elected Fellow of the Royal College of Physicians, serving on its council between 1931 and 1933. In 1929 he was elected a Fellowship of the Royal Colleges of Surgeons. In the same year he became a foundation Fellow of the Royal College of Obstetricians and Gynaecologists. In 1934, Berkley was made a Knight Bachelor in the Birthday Honours list.

An administrative building named after him stands on the Luton and Dunstable Hospital site.

== Selected publications ==
- A Handbook for Midwives and Obstetric Dressers. London, 1906; 12th edition 1943.
- Gynaecology for Nurses and Gynaecological Nursing. London, 1910; 9th edition 1943.
- A Textbook of Gynaecological Surgery. London, 1911; 4th edition 1941. (With Victor Bonney)
- The Difficulties and Emergencies of Obstetric Practice. London, 1913; 3rd ed 1921. (With Victor Bonney)
- A Guide to Gynaecology in General Practice. London, 1915; 2nd edition 1919. (With Victor Bonney)
- The Annals of the Middlesex Hospital at Clacton-on-Sea, 1914–1919. London, 1921. (With Victor Bonney)
- An Atlas of Midwifery. London, 1926; 2nd edition 1932. (Illustrated by Georges M. Dupuy)
- A Guide to the Profession of Nursing. London, 1931.
- The Abnormal in Obstetrics. London, 1938. (With Victor Bonney and Douglas Macleod)
- Pictorial Midwifery. London. 4th edition 1941.
