= Morcellator =

Surgical instrument used in removing large masses of tissues during laparoscopy

A morcellator is a surgical instrument used for division and removal of large masses of tissues during laparoscopic surgery. In laparoscopic hysterectomy the uterus is cut up in strips, or morcellated, into smaller pieces inside the patient's abdominal cavity in order to extract from the abdomen. It can consist of a hollow cylinder that penetrates the abdominal wall, ending with sharp edges or cutting jaws, through which a grasper can be inserted to pull the mass into the cylinder to cut out an extractable piece.

== Surgery ==
Laparoscopic morcellation is commonly used at surgery to remove bulky specimens from the abdomen using minimally invasive techniques. Historically, morcellation was performed using a device that required the surgeon or assistant to manually 'squeeze' the handle. Other reports describe using a scalpel directly through the abdomen to create small specimens that can be drawn out of the abdominal cavity. In 1993, the first electric morcellator was introduced in the US market. It was initially used for uterine extraction, but later applied to other organs. The use of morcellators at surgery has now become commonplace, with at least 5 devices currently on the US market. Despite decades of experience, there remains limited understanding of the short-term and long-term sequelae of morcellation. Concerns have been raised about injury to surrounding organs including bowel, bladder, ureters, pancreas, spleen and major vascular structures. Long-term issues may include parasitic growth of retained tissue with the potential to cause adhesions, cause bowel dysfunction and potentially disseminate unrecognized cancer.

== Safety concerns ==
Morcellation is associated with spreading of cellular material of the morcellated tissue. In gynecologic surgery for benign pathologies, there is approximately a 0.1% risk of an unexpected leiomyosarcoma. After morcellation, 64% of such cases may develop disseminated disease which is of particular concern because of the considerable mortality of leiomyosarcoma. Morcellation of the more frequent benign leiomyoma variants may also cause disseminated disease, which while not associated with increased mortality is frequently inoperable and therefore much more difficult to manage than the original disease.

Since April 2014, the Food and Drug Administration (FDA) has discouraged its use for uterine procedures, issuing a warning that morcellators may spread occult cancer in the course of fibroid removal. A second warning was followed in November of the same year. Johnson & Johnson subsequently suspended sale of its morcellators until the role of morcellation "is redefined by the FDA and the medical community," and later pulled its morcellators from the market. Critics of this device have mounted a high-profile campaign to have the devices recalled. At least one device maker has threatened legal action against what it calls "unfounded and unproven allegations." In the same statement, the FDA discouraged the use of power morcellators in patients seeking hysterectomy (removal of uterus through lower abdomen) and myomectomy (surgery to remove uterine fibroids—also called leiomyomas) procedures, estimating that approximately 1 in 350 of such patients is found to have an unsuspected uterine sarcoma, a type of uterine cancer that includes leiomyosarcoma.

The FDA says that it has known for some time that the morcellators could spread uterine cancer, but the recent attention given to the subject because of the death of Barbara Leary lead them to reopen the investigation, and they discovered a higher risk than was initially reported. Magdy Milad, chief of gynecology and gynecologic surgery at Northwestern Memorial Hospital, reported that "there were times connections were made but not reported."

The problem of secondary leiomyosarcoma and parasitic leiomyoma after gynaecological surgeries is not new and such problems have been reported independently of the methods of surgery. The surgery may not be the only or main culprit: the disseminated disease may also be the result of predisposition, reduced paracrine feedback, or metastasis independent of surgery. According to some studies, there was no difference in the overall survival of women with unsuspected uterine malignancy, with or without endometrial cancer, between the laparotomic myomectomy group and the laparoscopic myomectomy group.

== See also ==
- Instruments used in general surgery
