= Bonney myomectomy clamp =

Surgical device

- Specialty: Gynaecology
- Intervention: Myomectomy
- Inventor(s): Victor Bonney
- [edit on Wikidata]

The Bonney myomectomy clamp is a surgical clamp developed in the interwar years by gynaecologist Victor Bonney to provide a blood free environment when performing a myomectomy to remove uterine fibroids. It allowed the conservation of the uterus and the resulting preservation of fertility in women of reproductive age who wished to have children. It is seldom used now.
