= Vaginal cuff =

Human body part

The vaginal cuff is the upper portion of the vagina that opens up into the peritoneum and is sutured shut after the removal of the cervix and uterus during a hysterectomy.

The vaginal cuff is created by suturing together the edges of the surgical site where the cervix was attached to the vagina. This is accomplished by bringing the edges of the vagina together and suturing them together and to the uterosacral ligaments to prevent prolapse. The peritoneum is also sewn into the newly created vaginal cuff. There may be an advantage to using one method of closure over another. The vaginal cuff has a tendency to partially or completely dehisce or open up.

A further complication that can accompany the dehiscence of the vaginal cuff is evisceration or the movement of intestines into the vagina. Some or all of the vaginal cuff can reopen.

The risk of vaginal cuff complications is related to the approach to hysterectomy: robotic-assisted total laparoscopic hysterectomy, total laparoscopic hysterectomy, laparoscopic-assisted vaginal hysterectomy, total abdominal hysterectomy, and total vaginal hysterectomy.

The vaginal cuff can be stressed by sexual intercourse, chronic constipation, asthma, COPD, and other actions that increase intra-abdominal pressure. This structure is prone to infection, hematoma and other postoperative complications. Factors that are thought to affect wound healing are radiation treatments, age, pelvic organ prolapse, the use of corticosteroids, concurrent malignancy.

Though rare, estimates of the prevalence of vaginal cuff dehiscence after hysterectomy are estimated and reported to be between 0.14 and 4.1% per the American College of Obstetricians and Gynecologists (ACOG). If the vaginal cuff is compromised, vaginal evisceration can occur with the small intestine protruding out through the vagina.
