= Bonney's round ligament forceps =

Surgical instrument

- Intervention: gynaecological surgery
- Inventor(s): Victor Bonney
- [edit on Wikidata]

Bonney's round ligament forceps, sometimes known as Berkely-Bonny's round ligament forceps, is a surgical instrument used in gynaecological surgery named after Victor Bonney.
