= Georges M. Dupuy =

French physician and medical illustrator

- Born: 8 April 1858; Paris, France
- Died: 20 December 1935 (aged 77); West Dulwich, London, England
- Medical career
- Profession: Physician
- Field: Medical illustration
- Notable works: The Stretcher Bearer and Baillière’s atlases of the male and female body

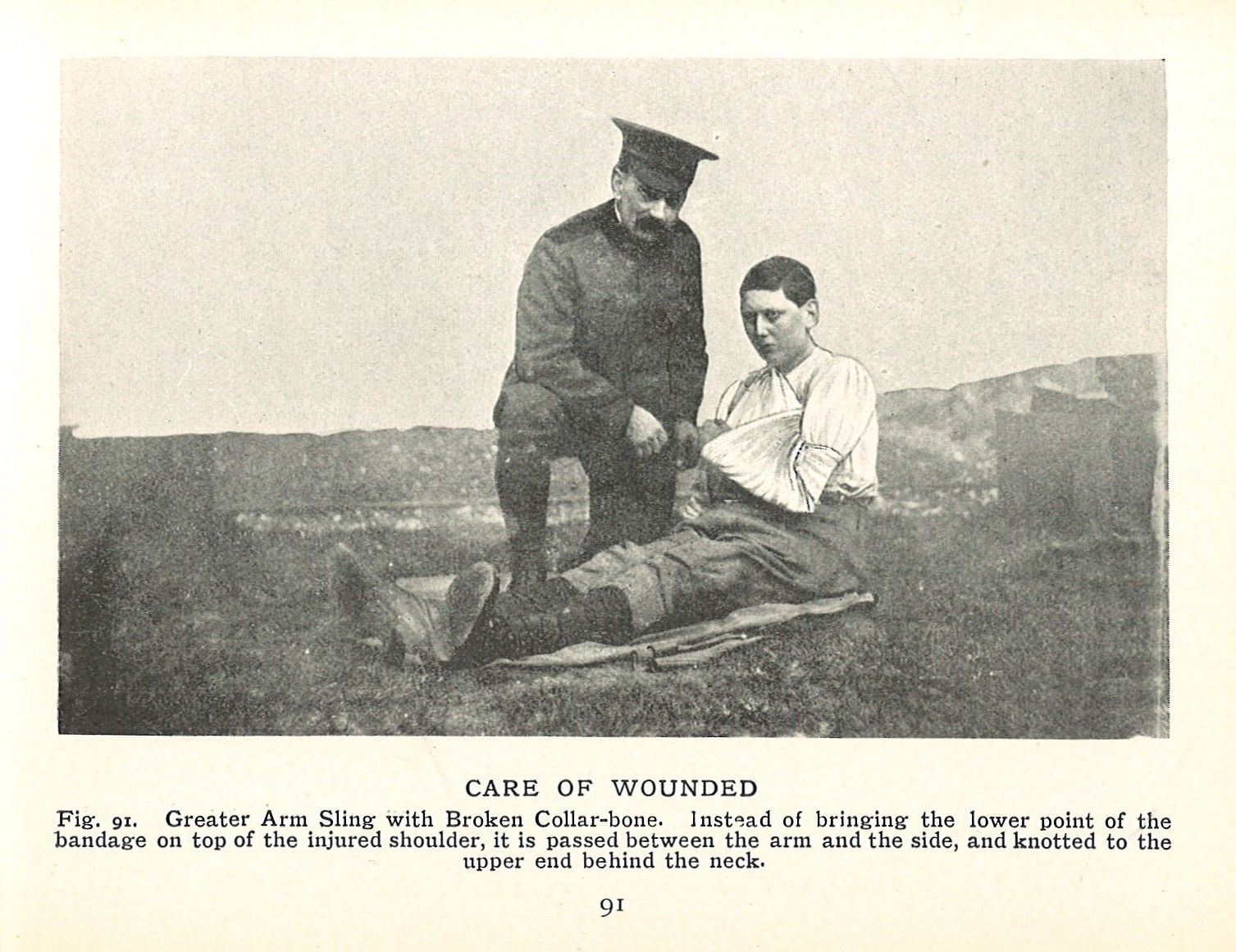
"Care of the Wounded" from The Stretcher Bearer, 1915.

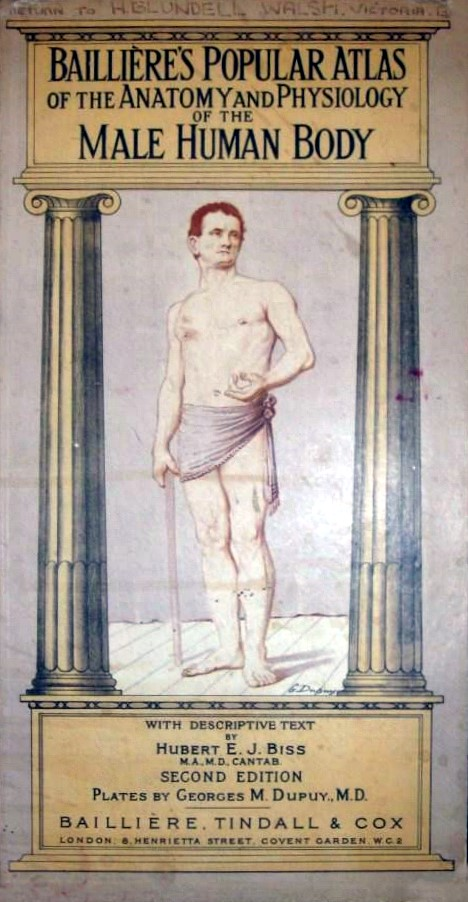
Baillière’s Popular Atlas of the Anatomy and Physiology of the Male Human Body for which Dupuy drew the plates.

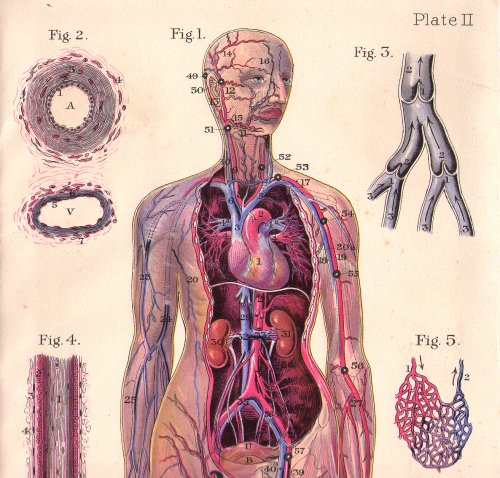
Plate II from Baillière's atlas of the female body (cropped)

Georges Marie Dupuy (8 April 1858 – 20 December 1935) was a French physician and medical illustrator known for The Stretcher Bearer (1915), and his drawings for Baillière's atlases of the male and female body and for Comyns Berkeley's Atlas of Midwifery (1926).

== Early life and family ==
Georges Dupuy was born in Paris to Paul Dupuy and Catherine Schmidt. He married an Englishwoman, Amy Harriet Evens, in New Jersey, United States, in 1895.

== Career ==
Dupuy qualified as a physician with the degree of M.D. but is best known as a medical illustrator. His first book was The Stretcher Bearer: A Companion to the R.A.M.C. Training Book (1915), under the general editorship of D'Arcy Power, when he was serving with the Stretcher-bearer Ambulance Section of C. Norwood Company, Lambeth Battalion, Volunteer Training Corps which included 138 photographs showing correct practice in stretcher-bearing.

He is best known, however, for his plates for Baillière's atlases of the male and female body, for which Hubert E.J. Biss provided the text, and for Comyns Berkeley's Atlas of Midwifery (1926). He prepared the plates that were used up to the third edition of Baillière. For the fourth edition onwards, around 1952, the plates were drawn by Douglas J. Kidd.

== Death ==
Dupuy died on 20 December 1935. His address at the time of his death was 51 Rosendale Road, West Dulwich, Surrey. Probate was granted in 1936 to his widow, Amy.

== Selected publications ==
Dupuy prepared the illustrations for the following works:

- The Stretcher Bearer: A Companion to the R.A.M.C. Training Book, Illustrating the Stretcher-Bearer Drill and the Handling and Carrying of Wounded. Henry Frowde and Hodder & Stoughton, London, 1915.
- Biss, Hubert E.J. Baillière’s Popular Atlas of the Anatomy and Physiology of the Male Human Body. Baillière, Tindall & Cox, London.
- Biss, Hubert E.J. Baillière’s Popular Atlas of the Anatomy and Physiology of the Female Human Body. Baillière, Tindall & Cox, London. (3rd 1938)
- Berkeley, Comyns. An Atlas of Midwifery. Baillière, Tindall & Cox, London, 1926. (2nd edition 1932)
- Browne, Thomas George. Atlas of the Anatomy and Physiology of the Ox. Baillière, Tindall & Cox, London, 1927.
