= Nora W. Coffey =

American women's health advocate

Nora W. Coffey

Nora W. Coffey is a women's health advocate, activist, and educator. She founded the Hysterectomy Educational Resources and Services (HERS) Foundation in 1982.

== Career ==
Coffey has lectured in the United States and Europe. She has been a guest lecturer at medical schools, nursing schools for undergraduate, and graduate programs. She has presented papers to Women and Gender Studies Conferences and women’s health organizations. She has also been interviewed by 20/20, Oprah Winfrey, Phil Donahue, and Good Morning America. Interviews with Coffey have appeared in the New York Times, Los Angeles Times, Philadelphia Inquirer, Boston Globe, New York Magazine, Newsweek, USA Today, Ms. Magazine, and others.

She has testified at U.S. Food and Drug Administration hearings and works with the FDA to ensure the reporting of adverse events of uterine artery embolization.

Coffey founded the Hysterectomy Educational Resources and Services (HERS) Foundation in 1982. The foundation is the only independent, nonprofit organization solely dedicated to the alternatives to, and the aftermath of hysterectomy.

Rick Schweikert's "on becoming," which had its Off-Broadway debut in 2004, was directed by Coffey. It was subsequently seen in 23 cities and produced in Washington, D.C., in 2005. It received praise from Barbara Seaman, health advocate, and author of The Greatest Experiment Ever Performed on Women: Exploding the Estrogen Myth.

Coffey is working toward a sustainable legal remedy to end hysterectomy without the information requisite to informed consent.

Coffey and Schweikert’s book, The H Word, about the physical, political, economic, and social environment surrounding hysterectomy, was published in 2009.

Coffey was honored by the organization Women's Way of Philadelphia at their 32nd Annual Powerful Voice Awards on May 6, 2009.
