= Chassar Moir =

Scottish obstetrician and academic (1900–1977)

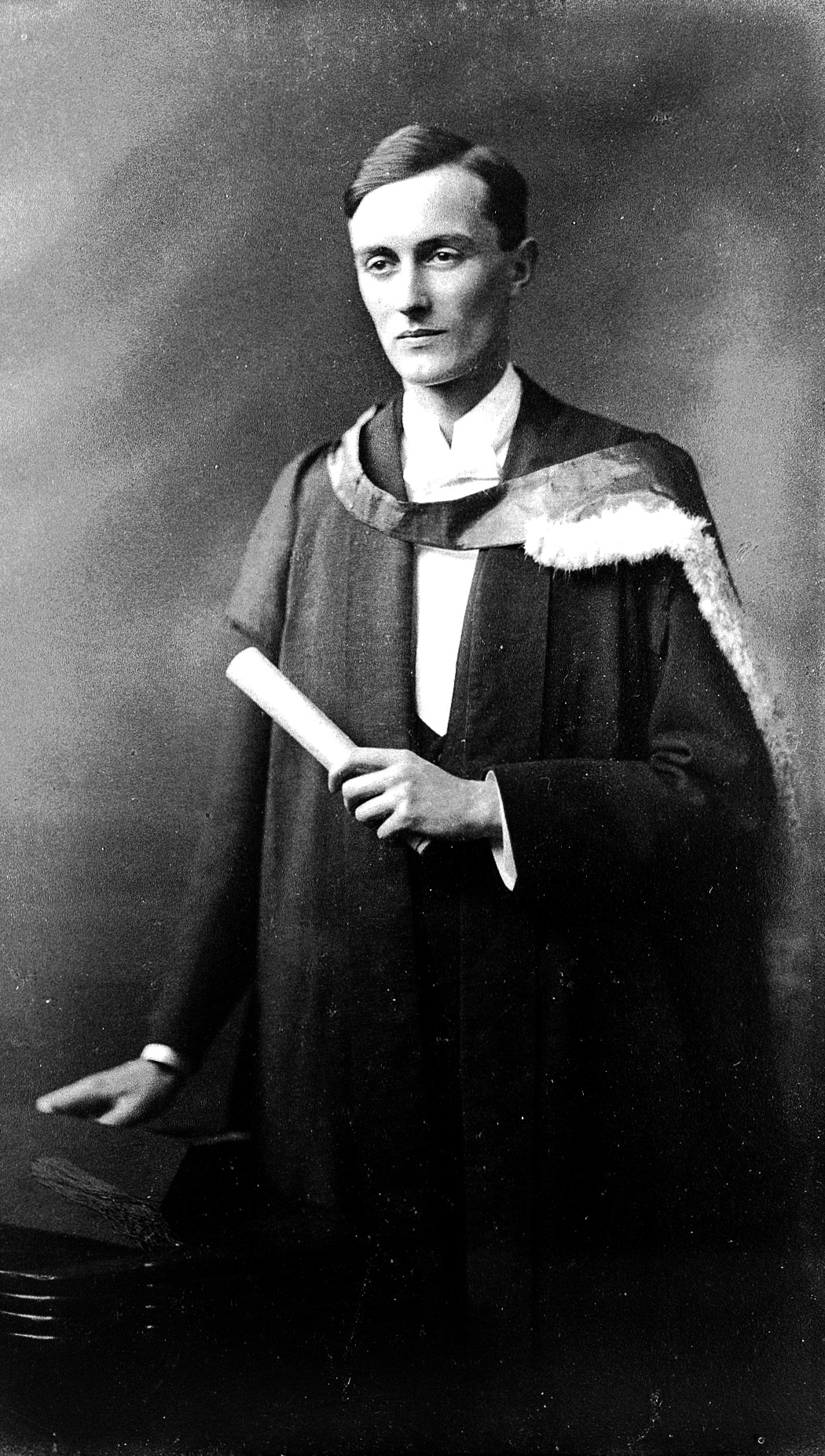
Chassar Moir at his graduation in 1922. Credit: Wellcome Library

(John) Chassar Moir CBE (21 March 1900 – 24 November 1977) was Professor of Obstetrics and Gynaecology at The University of Oxford.

"One whose contributions were so outstanding as to make Chassar Moir’s an immortal name in the history of Obstetrics and Gynaecology". Sir Norman Jeffcoate

Surgeon, researcher and discoverer who defined the characteristics and medical benefits of the ergot alkaloids of ‘Ergometrine’, the drug credited with saving hundreds of thousands of women’s lives, worldwide; who improved self-delivered nitrous oxide anaesthesia for women in labour, developed the use of x-rays in pelvimetry for pregnant women to aid safe delivery and developed advanced repair techniques for fistula injuries in women around the world, writing the standard textbook.

"A great and a gentle man; a man who did more than anyone living today to save the lives and relieve the miseries of women." British Medical Journal, 1977.

== Early life ==
Chassar Moir was born in Montrose, Angus, Scotland, the youngest of four children and the second son of John Moir of Montrose and Isabella Pirie, of Brechin.

Moir was educated at Montrose Academy developing interests in botany, the sciences and German. He entered The University of Edinburgh aged 17.

== Medical career ==
Moir graduated M.B., Ch.B. from the University of Edinburgh Faculty of Medicine, in 1922. He chose obstetrics as his special subject.

Following house surgeon appointments he sailed as to India as a Ship’s Surgeon. He subsequently returned to general practice in East Surrey.

He obtained Fellowship of Royal College of Surgeons of Edinburgh in 1926, and prepared his M.D. thesis whilst in general practice. He was awarded his M.D., with gold medal, in 1930.
Moir was awarded Rockefeller Foundation Travelling Fellowship as a medical scholar, 1932. He visited hospitals in Vienna, Budapest, Leipzig and Berlin: during this time he became proficient in German, using medical libraries to research historical writings on a fungus of rye - Claviceps purpurea - that was known for its ability to produce strong contractions in the pregnant uterus.

He was appointed First Assistant to the Obstetric Unit of University College Hospital, London. With Dr. H. Ward Dudley, F.R.S., he researched the active agent(s) of a liquid extract of ergot which took almost four years’ work to isolate and for the chemistry to be described, resulting in the new drug ‘Ergometrine’. The drug was found to be effective and constant in action, and its use to prevent postpartum haemorrhage became universal. It has saved countless women's lives throughout the world and is ranked one of the greatest contributions to medical knowledge of the twentieth century.

Moir decreed that ‘Ergometrine’ was to have its method of preparation published in full, and that no patent or proprietary interests were to encumber it: it was to be free for any manufacturer to produce.

At University College Hospital Moir met and married Theatre Sister Grace Hilda Bailey, of Strand-on-the-Green, 1933.They lived at 11 Chadlington Road in North Oxford from 1938 to 1957, and an Oxfordshire Blue Plaque was unveiled on this house in his memory on 6 July 2019. His granddaughter is the journalist and broadcaster Fi Glover.

In 1937 he was appointed the first Nuffield Professor of Obstetrics and Gynaecology at the University of Oxford. The following year he appointed John Stallworthy as his first assistant. For relief of pain in childbirth, Moir devised an analgesic apparatus which could be used for self-administration by the woman and gave faster pain relief than the existing apparatus (25 seconds as opposed to 40 seconds), and that could be used for prolonged periods to no ill effect on mother or baby.

Important contributions made by Moir and his department included developing the use of X-rays to detect the placental site, new methods of pelvimetry, the use of pudendal block, research by Mostyn Embrey on prostaglandins, the research by C. Scott Russell on the effect of oxytocin on isolated uterine muscle strips, and a study of amniocentesis.

Moir’s outstanding contribution to gynaecological surgery was the repair of vesicovaginal fistulae and stress incontinence using the ‘gauze hammock’ method, resulting in an exceptionally high success rate.

On retirement from the University of Oxford in 1967 he became Visiting Professor at the Postgraduate Medical School Hammersmith where he continued to lecture and to operate on patients, until shortly before his death, from cancer, in 1977.

His obituary in the British Medical Journal described him as "A great and a gentle man; a man who did more than anyone living today to save the lives and relieve the miseries of women."

== Publications ==
=== Textbooks ===
J.C.M. Joint author with Munro Kerr of Munro Kerr’s ‘Operative Obstetrics’, 5th edition, 1949.

J.C.M. ‘Operative Obstetrics’, 6th edition, 1956.

J.C.M. ‘Vesico-vaginal Fistula’, 1961.

J.C.M. 2nd edition ‘Vesico-vaginal Fistula’, 1967.

=== Papers ===
Numerous published, including:

Moir J.C., Dale H.H. ‘The action of ergot preparations on the puerperal uterus.’ B.M.J. 1932.

Dudley H.W., Moir J.C. ‘The substance responsible for the traditional clinical effect of ergot.’ B.M.J. 1935.

‘History and Present Day Use of Ergot’. Jl. Med. Canad. Assn. 1955.

‘Ergot: From ‘St Anthony’s Fire’ to the Isolation of its Active Principle Ergometrine (Ergonovine).’ Am. Journ. of Obstetrics and Gynaecology. 1974.

== Recognition ==
M.D. Edinburgh University Gold Medal 1930

Awarded Rockefeller Medical Travelling Scholarship

University of Oxford: Awarded D.M. 1938

Fellow Oriel College 1937 – 67

Vice-Provost Oriel College 1962 – 65

Nuffield Professor Emeritus, University of Oxford 1967 – 77

Honorary Fellow Oriel College 1974 – 77

== Honours ==
1954 Hon. D.Sc. Queen’s University, Kingston, Ontario, Canada

1955 Hon. LLD. Queen’s University, Belfast

1955 Hon. Corresponding Fellow of New York Academy of Medicine

1955 Hon. Fellow American Association of Obstetrics and Gynaecology

1955 M.M.S.A., ‘Honoris Causa’, Society of Apothecaries of London

1955 Joseph Price Orator: Johns Hopkins Hospital, Baltimore, U.S.A.

1960 The Eardley Holland Gold Medal, Royal College of Obstetricians & Gynaecologists

1961 Appointed C.B.E.

1970 Hon. D.Sc. Edinburgh

== Archives ==
Wellcome Institute: C.M.A.C. Acc.no. 340; ref. PP/JCM

Royal College of Obstetricians and Gynaecologists: ‘Special Collections’ ref. S/02.

Items in: R.C.O/G. College Museum; Wellcome Galleries of the Science Museum.

Royal Society of Medicine: Ref no. GB 1538 S 97/4; Papers, J.C.M., Ref. S2
