= Hubert E. J. Biss =

British physician and medical writer

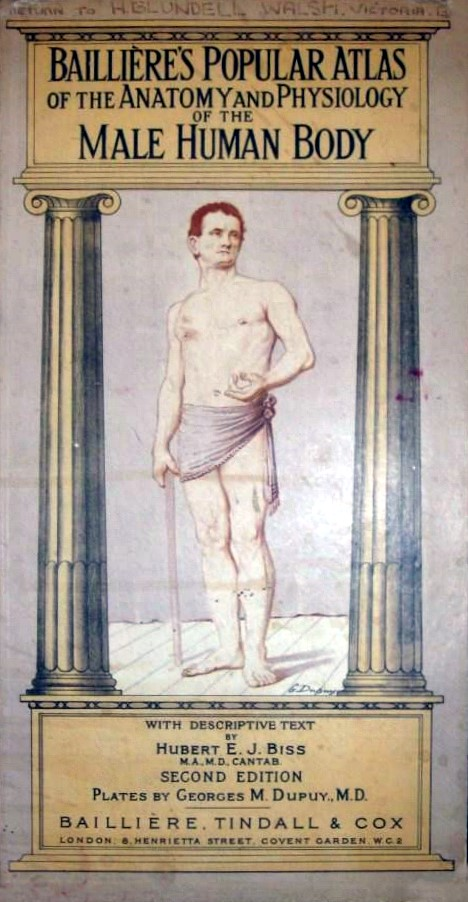
Baillière’s Popular Atlas of the Anatomy and Physiology of the Male Human Body for which Biss provided the text.

Hubert Elwyn Jones Biss (28 September 1871 – 20 September 1909) was a British physician and medical writer. He attended William Gladstone at his deathbed in 1898 and wrote the text for the long-running Baillière's atlases of the male and female body.

== Early life and family ==
Hubert Biss was born in New Zealand on 28 September 1871, the son of Cecil Yates Biss MD FRCP, and his wife Janet. His grandfather was John Jones, a landowner in Dunedin, New Zealand.

He was schooled at Dulwich College and graduated from the University of Cambridge BA in 1892, subsequently acquiring his MA, MB, BC, and his MD in 1901. His brother Harold was also at Cambridge and served as a major in the Royal Irish Regiment during the First World War.

He married Janie Williamson Biss.

== Career ==
Biss's early medical career was at the Middlesex Hospital and the Brompton Consumptive Hospital, at both of which his father had also worked. He also worked at the Grove and Park fever hospitals. He was one of the physicians that attended William Gladstone at his deathbed in 1898 and lived at Hawarden Castle for six months at that time.

Among his medical writings was the text for the long-running Baillière's atlases of the male and female body for which Georges M. Dupuy provided the illustrations. He was the assistant editor for The Medical Press and Circular.

== Death ==
Biss died at Connaught House, Gildredge Road, Eastbourne, on 20 September 1909.

== Selected publications ==
- "The Preservation of the Eyesight in Children", The Illuminating Engineer, Vol. 3 (1908), pp. 65-?.
- "School Life and Healthy Growth", Education Outlook, Vols. 61-62 (1908), pp. 256–59.
- Baillière’s Popular Atlas of the Anatomy and Physiology of the Male Human Body. Baillière, Tindall & Cox, London.
- Baillière’s Popular Atlas of the Anatomy and Physiology of the Female Human Body. Baillière, Tindall & Cox, London. (3rd 1938)
