= Hysterectomy =

Surgical removal of the uterus

- Diagram showing what is removed with a radical hysterectomy
- Specialty: Gynaecology
- ICD-9-CM: 68.9
- MeSH: D007044
- MedlinePlus: 002915

Hysterectomy is the surgical removal of the uterus and cervix. Supracervical hysterectomy refers to the removal of the uterus while the cervix is spared. These procedures may also involve removal of the ovaries (oophorectomy), fallopian tubes (salpingectomy), and other surrounding structures. The terms "partial" or "total" hysterectomy are lay terms that incorrectly describe the addition or omission of oophorectomy at the time of hysterectomy. These procedures are usually performed by a gynecologist. Removal of the uterus is a form of sterilization, rendering the patient unable to bear children (as does removal of ovaries and fallopian tubes) and has surgical risks as well as long-term effects, so the surgery is normally recommended only when other treatment options are not available or have failed. It is the second most commonly performed gynecological surgical procedure, after cesarean section, in the United States. Nearly 68 percent were performed for conditions such as endometriosis, irregular bleeding, and uterine fibroids. It is expected that the frequency of hysterectomies for non-malignant indications will continue to fall, given the development of alternative treatment options.

== Medical uses ==
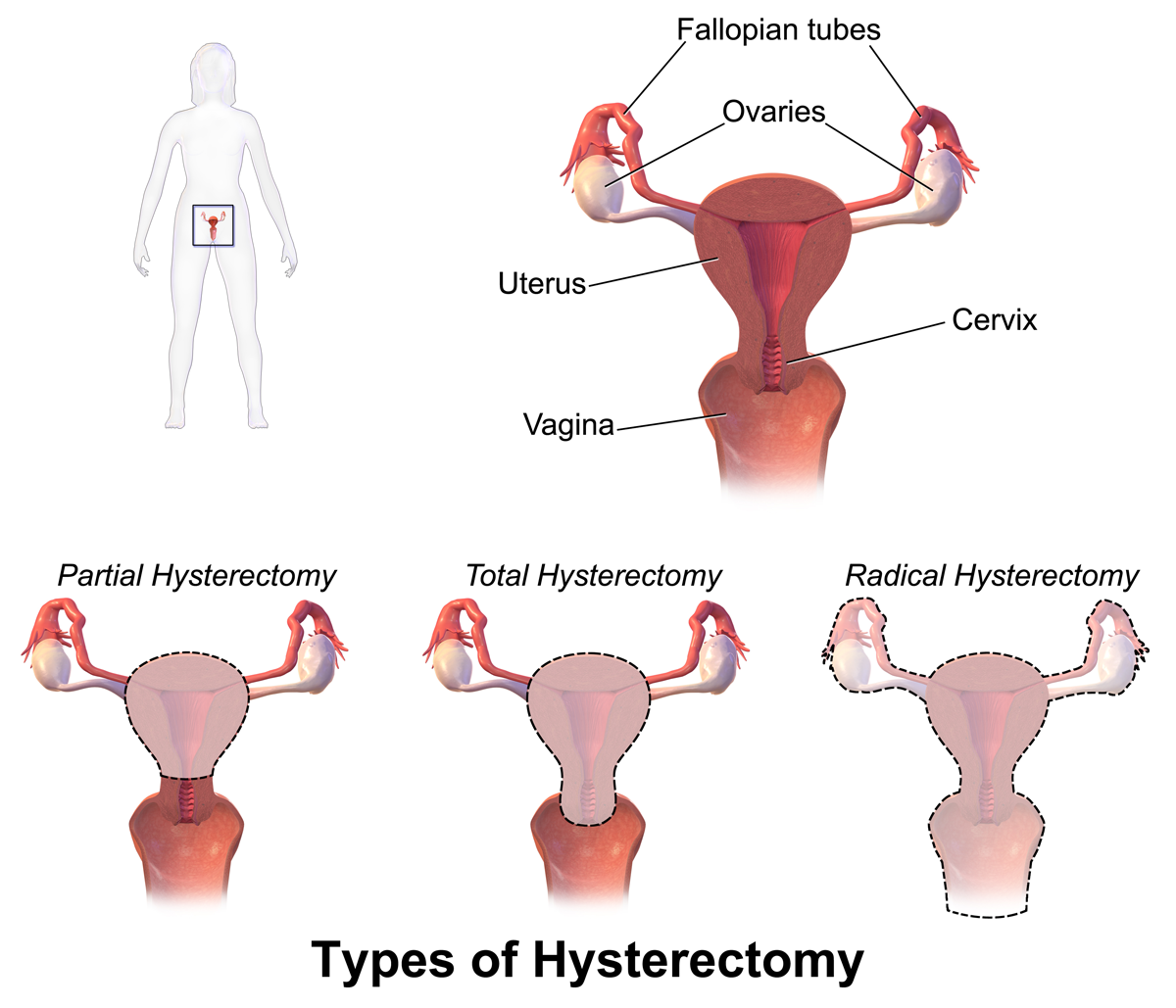
Hysterectomy

Hysterectomy is a major surgical procedure that has risks and benefits. It affects the hormonal balance and overall health of patients. Because of this, hysterectomy is normally recommended as a last resort after pharmaceutical or other surgical options have been exhausted to remedy certain intractable and severe uterine/reproductive system conditions. There may be other reasons for a hysterectomy to be requested. Such conditions and/or indications include, but are not limited to:

- Endometriosis: growth of the uterine lining outside the uterine cavity. This inappropriate tissue growth can lead to pain and bleeding.
- Adenomyosis: a form of endometriosis, where the uterine lining has grown into and sometimes through the uterine wall musculature. This can thicken the uterine walls and also contribute to pain and bleeding.
- Heavy menstrual bleeding: irregular or excessive menstrual bleeding for greater than a week. It can disturb the regular quality of life and may be indicative of a more serious condition.
- Uterine fibroids: benign growths on the uterus wall. These muscular noncancerous tumors can grow in single form or in clusters and can cause extreme pain and bleeding.
- Uterine prolapse: when the uterus sags down due to weakened or stretched pelvic floor muscles potentially causing the uterus to protrude out of the vagina in more severe cases.
- Reproductive system cancer prevention: especially if there is a strong family history of reproductive system cancers (especially breast cancer in conjunction with BRCA1 or BRCA2 mutation), or as part of recovery from such cancers.
- Gynecologic cancer: depending on the type of hysterectomy, can aid in the treatment of cancer or precancer of the endometrium, cervix, or uterus. To protect against or treat cancer of the ovaries, one would need an oophorectomy.
- Transgender (trans) male affirmation: aids in gender dysphoria, prevention of future gynecologic problems, and transition to obtaining new legal gender documentation.
- Severe developmental disabilities: this treatment is controversial at best. In the United States, specific cases of sterilization due to developmental disabilities have been found by state-level Supreme Courts to violate the patient's constitutional and common-law rights.
- Postpartum: to remove either a severe case of placenta praevia (a placenta that has either formed over or inside the birth canal) or placenta percreta (a placenta that has grown into and through the wall of the uterus to attach itself to other organs), as well as a last resort in case of excessive obstetrical haemorrhage.
- Chronic pelvic pain: should try to obtain the pain etiology, although it may have no known cause.
- PMS and menstrual pain and other psychic and physical conditions caused by the menstrual period and causing suffering and diminishing life quality.

== Risks and adverse effects ==
In 1995, the short-term mortality (within 40 days of surgery) was reported at 0.38 cases per 1000 when performed for benign causes. Risks for surgical complications were the presence of fibroids, younger age (vascular pelvis with higher bleeding risk and larger uterus), dysfunctional uterine bleeding and parity.

The mortality rate is several times higher when performed in patients who are pregnant, have cancer or other complications.

The long-term effect on all case mortality is relatively small. Women under the age of 45 years have a significantly increased long-term mortality that is believed to be caused by the hormonal side effects of hysterectomy and prophylactic oophorectomy. This effect is not limited to pre-menopausal women; even women who have already entered menopause were shown to have experienced a decrease in long-term survivability post-oophorectomy.

Approximately 35% of women after hysterectomy undergo another related surgery within 2 years.

Ureteral injury is not uncommon and occurs in 0.2 per 1,000 cases of vaginal hysterectomy and 1.3 per 1,000 cases of abdominal hysterectomy. The injury usually occurs in the distal ureter close to the infundibulopelvic ligament or as a ureter crosses below the uterine artery, often from blind clamping and ligature placement to control hemorrhage.

=== Recovery ===
Hospital stay is 3 to 5 days or more for the abdominal procedure and between 1 and 2 days (but possibly longer) for vaginal or laparoscopically assisted vaginal procedures. After the procedure, the American College of Obstetricians and Gynecologists recommends not inserting anything into the vagina for the first 6 weeks (including inserting tampons or having sex).

=== Unintended oophorectomy and premature ovarian failure ===
Removal of one or both ovaries is performed in a substantial number of hysterectomies that were intended to be ovary sparing.

The average onset age of menopause after hysterectomy with ovarian conservation is 3.7 years earlier than average. This has been suggested to be due to the disruption of blood supply to the ovaries after a hysterectomy or due to missing endocrine feedback of the uterus. The function of the remaining ovaries is significantly affected in about 40% of people, and some of them even require hormone replacement therapy. Surprisingly, a similar and only slightly weaker effect has been observed for endometrial ablation which is often considered as an alternative to hysterectomy.

A substantial number of women develop benign ovarian cysts after a hysterectomy.

=== Effects on sexual life and pelvic pain ===
After hysterectomy for benign indications, the majority of patients report improvement in sexual life and pelvic pain. A smaller share of patients report worsening of their sexual life and other problems. The picture is significantly different for hysterectomy performed for malignant reasons; the procedure is often more radical with substantial side effects. A proportion of patients who undergo a hysterectomy for chronic pelvic pain continue to have pelvic pain after a hysterectomy and develop dyspareunia (painful sexual intercourse).

=== Premature menopause and its effects ===
Hysterectomies that also include the surgical removal of the ovaries (i.e. an oophorectomy) result in significant hormonal changes to the body. Estrogen levels fall sharply when the ovaries are removed, removing the protective effects of estrogen on the cardiovascular and skeletal systems. This condition is often referred to as "surgical menopause", although it is substantially different from a naturally occurring menopausal state; the former is a sudden hormonal shock to the body that causes rapid onset of menopausal symptoms such as hot flashes, while the latter is a gradually occurring decrease of hormonal levels over a period of years with uterus intact and ovaries able to produce hormones even after the cessation of menstrual periods.

One study showed that the risk of subsequent cardiovascular disease is substantially increased for women who had a hysterectomy at age 50 or younger. No association was found for women undergoing the procedure after age 50. The risk is higher when ovaries are removed, but still noticeable even when ovaries are preserved.

Several other studies have found that osteoporosis (decrease in bone density) and increased risk of bone fractures are associated with hysterectomies. This has been attributed to the modulatory effect of estrogen on calcium metabolism and the drop in serum estrogen levels after menopause can cause excessive loss of calcium leading to bone wasting.

Hysterectomies have also been linked with higher rates of heart disease and weakened bones. Those who have undergone a hysterectomy with both ovaries removed typically have reduced testosterone levels as compared to those left intact. Reduced levels of testosterone in women are predictive of height loss, which may occur as a result of reduced bone density, while increased testosterone levels in women are associated with a greater sense of sexual desire.

Oophorectomy before the age of 45 is associated with a fivefold mortality from neurologic and mental disorders.

=== Urinary incontinence and vaginal prolapse ===
Urinary incontinence and vaginal prolapse are well known adverse effects that develop with high frequency a very long time after the surgery. Typically, those complications develop 10–20 years after the surgery. For this reason exact numbers are not known, and risk factors are poorly understood. It is also unknown if the choice of surgical technique has any effect. It has been assessed that the risk for urinary incontinence is approximately doubled within 20 years after hysterectomy. One long-term study found a 2.4-fold increased risk for surgery to correct urinary stress incontinence following hysterectomy.

The risk for vaginal prolapse depends on factors such as number of vaginal deliveries, the difficulty of those deliveries, and the type of labor. Overall incidence is approximately doubled after hysterectomy.

=== Adhesion formation and bowel obstruction ===
The formation of postoperative adhesions is a particular risk after hysterectomy because of the extent of dissection involved as well as the fact the hysterectomy wound is in the most gravity-dependent part of the pelvis into which a loop of bowel may easily fall. In one review, incidence of small bowel obstruction due to intestinal adhesion was found to be 15.6% in non-laparoscopic total abdominal hysterectomies vs. 0.0% in laparoscopic hysterectomies.

=== Wound infection ===
Wound infection occurs in approximately 3% of cases of abdominal hysterectomy. The risk is increased by obesity, diabetes, immunodeficiency disorder, use of systemic corticosteroids, smoking, wound hematoma, and preexisting infection such as chorioamnionitis and pelvic inflammatory disease. Such wound infections mainly take the form of either incisional abscess or wound cellulitis. Typically, both confer erythema, but only an incisional abscess confers purulent drainage. The recommended treatment of an incisional abscess after hysterectomy is by incision and drainage, and then coverage by a thin layer of gauze followed by sterile dressing. The dressing should be changed and the wound irrigated with normal saline at least twice each day. In addition, it is recommended to administer an antibiotic active against staphylococci and streptococci, preferably vancomycin, when there is a risk of MRSA. The wound can be allowed to close by secondary intention. Alternatively, if the infection is cleared and healthy granulation tissue is evident at the base of the wound, the edges of the incision may be reapproximated, such as by using butterfly stitches, staples or sutures. Sexual intercourse remains possible after hysterectomy. Reconstructive surgery remains an option for women who have experienced benign and malignant conditions.

=== Other rare problems ===
Hysterectomy may cause an increased risk of the relatively rare renal cell carcinoma. The increased risk is particularly pronounced for young women; the risk was lower after vaginally performed hysterectomies. Hormonal effects or injury of the ureter were considered as possible explanations. In some cases, the renal cell carcinoma may be a manifestation of an undiagnosed hereditary leiomyomatosis and renal cell cancer syndrome.

Removal of the uterus without removing the ovaries can produce a situation that, on rare occasions, can result in ectopic pregnancy due to an undetected fertilization that had yet to descend into the uterus before surgery. Two cases have been identified and profiled in an issue of the Blackwell Journal of Obstetrics and Gynecology; over 20 other cases have been discussed in additional medical literature. On very rare occasions, sexual intercourse after hysterectomy may cause a transvaginal evisceration of the small bowel. The vaginal cuff is the uppermost region of the vagina that has been sutured closed. A rare complication, it can dehisce and allow the evisceration of the small bowel into the vagina.

== Alternatives ==
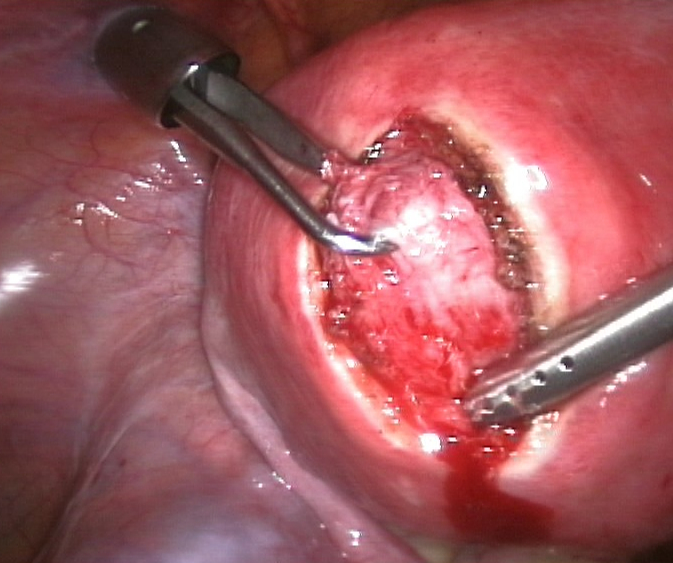
Myomectomy

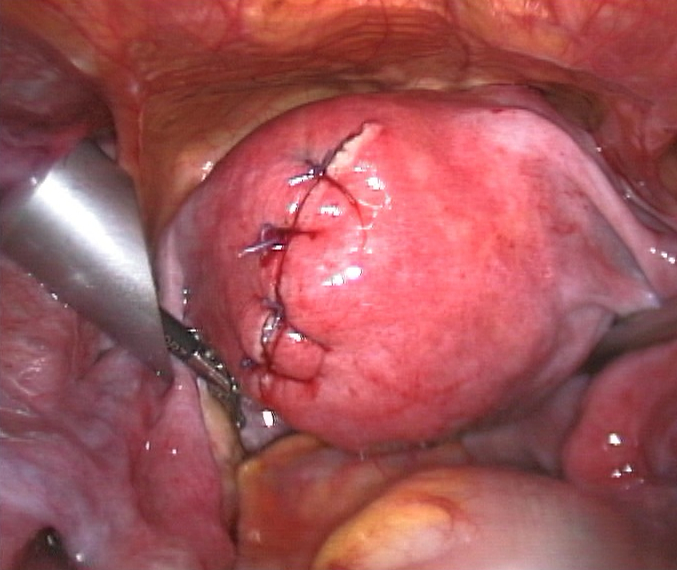
Sutured uterus wound after myomectomy

Depending on the indication, there are alternatives to hysterectomy:

=== Heavy bleeding ===
Levonorgestrel intrauterine devices are highly effective at controlling dysfunctional uterine bleeding (DUB) or menorrhagia and should be considered before any surgery.

Menorrhagia (heavy or abnormal menstrual bleeding) may also be treated with the less invasive endometrial ablation, which is an outpatient procedure in which the lining of the uterus is destroyed with heat, mechanically, or by radio frequency ablation. Endometrial ablation greatly reduces or eliminates monthly bleeding in ninety percent of patients with DUB. It is not effective for patients with very thick uterine lining or uterine fibroids.

=== Uterine fibroids ===
Levonorgestrel intrauterine devices are highly effective in limiting menstrual blood flow and improving other symptoms. Side effects are typically very moderate because the levonorgestrel (a progestin) is released in low concentration locally. There is now substantial evidence that Levonorgestrel-IUDs provide good symptomatic relief for women with fibroids.

Uterine fibroids may be removed and the uterus reconstructed in a procedure called "myomectomy". A myomectomy may be performed through an open incision, laparoscopically, or through the vagina (hysteroscopy).

Uterine artery embolization (UAE) is a minimally invasive procedure for treatment of uterine fibroids. Under local anesthesia, a catheter is introduced into the femoral artery at the groin and advanced under radiographic control into the uterine artery. A mass of microspheres or polyvinyl alcohol (PVA) material (an embolus) is injected into the uterine arteries to block the flow of blood through those vessels. The restriction in blood supply usually results in a significant reduction of fibroids and improvement of heavy bleeding tendency. The 2012 Cochrane review comparing hysterectomy and UAE did not find any major advantage for either procedure. While the UAE procedure is associated with shorter hospital stay and a more rapid return to normal daily activities, it was also associated with a higher risk for minor complications later on. There were no differences between UAE and hysterectomy with regards to major complications.

Uterine fibroids can be removed with a non-invasive procedure called Magnetic Resonance guided Focused Ultrasound (MRgFUS).

=== Uterine prolapse ===
Prolapse may also be corrected surgically without removal of the uterus. There are several strategies that can be utilized to help strengthen pelvic floor muscles and prevent the worsening of prolapse. These include, but are not limited to, use of "kegel exercises", vaginal pessary, constipation relief, weight management, and care when lifting heavy objects.

== Types ==
Schematic drawing of types of hysterectomy

Hysterectomy, in the literal sense of the word, means merely the removal of the uterus. However, other organs such as the ovaries, fallopian tubes, and the cervix are very frequently removed as part of the surgery.

- Radical hysterectomy: complete removal of the uterus, cervix, upper vagina, and parametrium. Indicated for cancer. Lymph nodes, ovaries, and fallopian tubes are also usually removed in this situation, such as in Wertheim's hysterectomy.
- Total hysterectomy: complete removal of the uterus and cervix, with or without oophorectomy.
- Subtotal hysterectomy: removal of the uterus, leaving the cervix in situ.
- There was no difference in the rates of incontinence, constipation, measures of sexual function, or alleviation of pre-surgery symptoms.
- Length of surgery and amount of blood lost during surgery were significantly reduced during supracervical hysterectomy compared to total hysterectomy, but there was no difference in post-operative transfusion rates.
- Febrile morbidity was less likely and ongoing cyclic vaginal bleeding one year after surgery was more likely after supracervical hysterectomy.
- There was no difference in the rates of other complications, recovery from surgery, or readmission rates.

In the short term, randomized trials have shown that cervical preservation or removal does not affect the rate of subsequent pelvic organ prolapse.

Supracervical hysterectomy does not eliminate the possibility of having cervical cancer since the cervix itself is left intact and may be contraindicated in women with increased risk of this cancer; regular pap smears to check for cervical dysplasia or cancer are still needed.

== Technique ==
Hysterectomy can be performed in different ways. The oldest known technique is vaginal hysterectomy. The first planned hysterectomy was performed by Konrad Johann Martin Langenbeck - Surgeon General of the Hannovarian army, although there are records of vaginal hysterectomy for prolapse going back as far as 50BC.

The first abdominal hysterectomy recorded was by Ephraim McDowell. He performed the procedure in 1809 for a mother of five with a large ovarian mass on her kitchen table.

In modern medicine today, laparoscopic vaginal (with additional instruments passing through ports in small abdominal incisions, close or in the navel) and total laparoscopic techniques have been developed.

=== Abdominal hysterectomy ===
Most hysterectomies in the United States are done via laparotomy (abdominal incision, not to be confused with laparoscopy). A transverse (Pfannenstiel) incision is made through the abdominal wall, usually above the pubic bone, as close to the upper hair line of the individual's lower pelvis as possible, similar to the incision made for a caesarean section. This technique allows physicians the greatest access to the reproductive structures and is normally done for the removal of the entire reproductive complex. The recovery time for an open hysterectomy is 4–6 weeks and sometimes longer due to the need to cut through the abdominal wall. Historically, the biggest problem with this technique was infections, but infection rates are well-controlled and not a major concern in modern medical practice. An open hysterectomy provides the most effective way to explore the abdominal cavity and perform complicated surgeries. Before the refinement of the vaginal and laparoscopic vaginal techniques, it was also the only possibility to achieve subtotal hysterectomy; meanwhile, the vaginal route is the preferable technique in most circumstances.

=== Vaginal hysterectomy ===
Vaginal hysterectomy is performed entirely through the vaginal canal and has clear advantages over abdominal surgery such as fewer complications, shorter hospital stays and shorter healing time. Abdominal hysterectomy, the most common method, is used in cases such as after caesarean delivery, when the indication is cancer, when complications are expected, or when surgical exploration is required.

=== Laparoscopic-assisted vaginal hysterectomy ===
With the development of laparoscopic techniques in the 1970s and 1980s, the "laparoscopic-assisted vaginal hysterectomy" (LAVH) has gained great popularity among gynecologists because compared with the abdominal procedure it is less invasive and the post-operative recovery is much faster. It also allows better exploration and slightly more complicated surgeries than the vaginal procedure. LAVH begins with laparoscopy and is completed such that the final removal of the uterus (with or without removing the ovaries) is via the vaginal canal. Thus, LAVH is also a total hysterectomy; the cervix is removed with the uterus. If the cervix is removed along with the uterus, the upper portion of the vagina is sutured together and called the vaginal cuff.

=== Laparoscopic-assisted supracervical hysterectomy ===
The "laparoscopic-assisted supracervical hysterectomy" (LASH) was later developed to remove the uterus without removing the cervix using a morcellator which cuts the uterus into small pieces that can be removed from the abdominal cavity via the laparoscopic ports.

=== Total laparoscopic hysterectomy ===
Total laparoscopic hysterectomy (TLH) was developed in the early 90s by Prabhat K. Ahluwalia in Upstate New York. TLH is performed solely through the laparoscopes in the abdomen, starting at the top of the uterus, typically with a uterine manipulator. The entire uterus is disconnected from its attachments using long, thin instruments through the "ports". Then, all the tissue to be removed is passed through the small abdominal incisions.

=== Other techniques ===
Supracervical (subtotal) laparoscopic hysterectomy (LSH) is performed similarly to total laparoscopic surgery, but the uterus is amputated between the cervix and fundus.

Dual-port laparoscopy is a form of laparoscopic surgery using two 5 mm midline incisions: the uterus is detached through the two ports and removed through the vagina.

"Robotic hysterectomy" is a variant of laparoscopic surgery using special, remotely controlled instruments that allow the surgeon finer control as well as three-dimensional magnified vision.

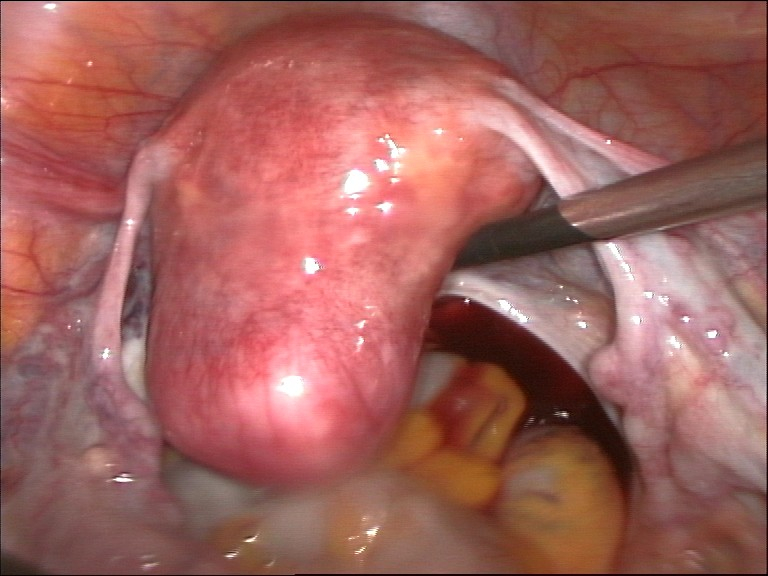
Uterus prior to hysterectomy

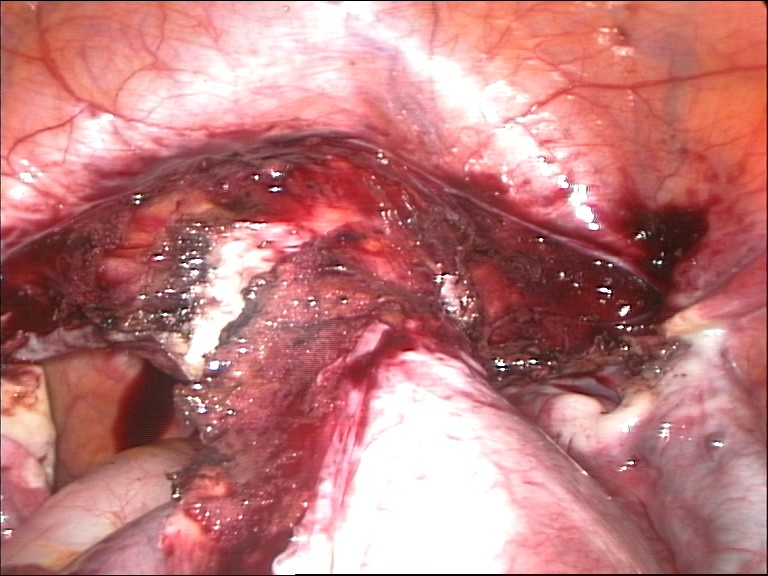
Laparoscopical hysterectomy

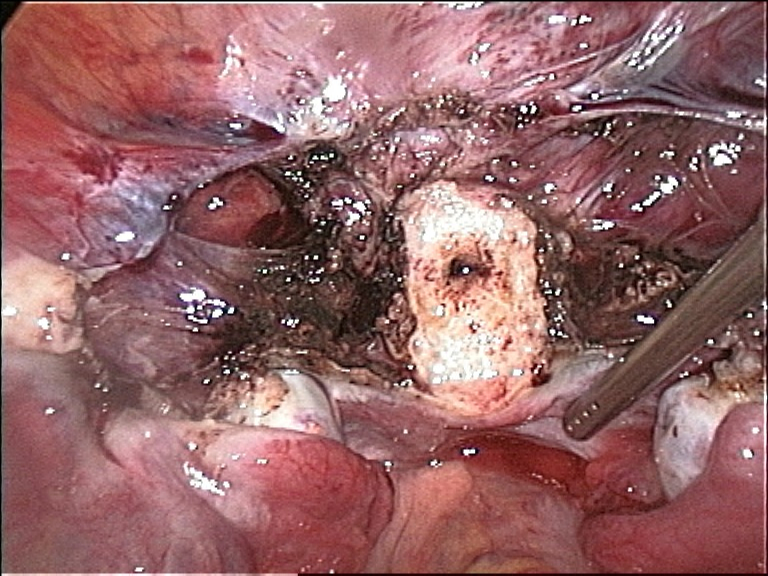
Cervical stump (white) after removal of the uterine corpus at laparoscopic supracervical hysterectomy

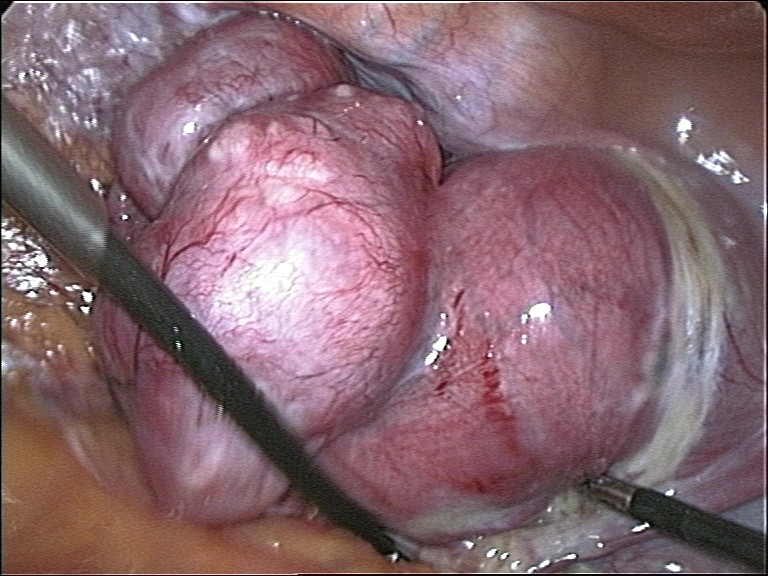
Transvaginal extraction of the uterus in total laparoscopical hysterectomy

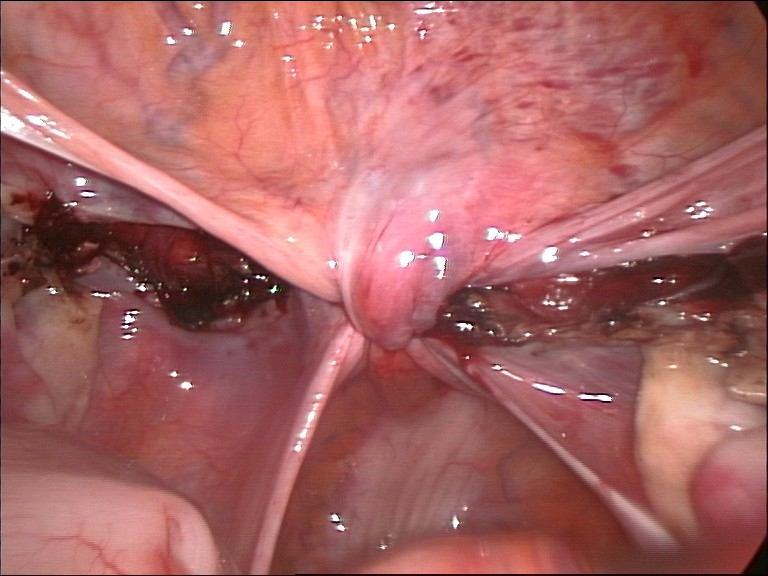
End of a laparoscopical hysterectomy

=== Comparison of techniques ===
Patient characteristics such as the reason for needing a hysterectomy, uterine size, descent of the uterus, presence of diseased tissues surrounding the uterus, previous surgery in the pelvic region, obesity, history of pregnancy, the possibility of endometriosis, or the need for an oophorectomy, will influence a surgeon's surgical approach when performing a hysterectomy.

Vaginal hysterectomy is recommended over other variants where possible for women with benign diseases. Vaginal hysterectomy was shown to be superior to LAVH and some types of laparoscopic surgery causing fewer short- and long-term complications, more favorable effect on sexual experience with shorter recovery times and fewer costs.

Laparoscopic surgery offers certain advantages when vaginal surgery is not possible but also has the disadvantage of significantly longer time required for the surgery.

In one 2004 study conducted in the UK comparing abdominal (laparotomic) and laparoscopic techniques, laparoscopic surgery was found to cause longer operation time and a higher rate of major complications while offering much quicker healing. In another study conducted in 2014, laparoscopy was found to be "a safe alternative to laparotomy" in patients receiving total hysterectomy for endometrial cancer. Researchers concluded the procedure "offers markedly improved perioperative outcomes with a lower reoperation rate and fewer postoperative complications when the standard of care shifts from open surgery to laparoscopy in a university hospital".

The abdominal technique is very often applied in difficult circumstances or when complications are expected. Given these circumstances, the complication rate and time required for surgery compares very favorably with other techniques; however time required for healing is much longer.

Hysterectomy by abdominal laparotomy is correlated with a much higher incidence of intestinal adhesions than other techniques.

Time required for completion of surgery in the eVAL trial is reported as follows:

- abdominal 55.2 minutes average, range 19–155
- vaginal 46.6 minutes average, range 14–168
- laparoscopic (all variants) 82.5 minutes average, range 10–325 (combined data from both trial arms)

Morcellation has been widely used especially in laparoscopic techniques and sometimes for the vaginal technique, but now appears to be associated with a considerable risk of spreading benign or malignant tumors. In April 2014, the FDA issued a memo alerting medical practitioners to the risks of power morcellation.

Robotic-assisted surgery is presently used in several countries for hysterectomies. Additional research is required to determine the benefits and risks involved, compared to conventional laparoscopic surgery.

A 2014 Cochrane review found that robotic-assisted surgery may have a similar complication rate when compared to conventional laparoscopic surgery. In addition, there is evidence to suggest that although the surgery may take longer, robotic-assisted surgery may result in shorter hospital stays. More research is necessary to determine if robotic-assisted hysterectomies are beneficial for people with cancer.

Previously reported marginal advantages of robotic-assisted surgery could not be confirmed; only differences in hospital stay and cost remain statistically significant. In addition, concerns over widespread misleading marketing claims have been raised.

Summary—Advantages and disadvantages of different hysterectomy techniques
| Technique | Benefits | Disadvantages |
|---|---|---|
| Abdominal hysterectomy | No limitation by the size of the uterus; Combination with reduction and incontinence surgery possible; No increase in post-surgical complications compared with vaginal | Longest recovery period and return to normal activities; May have a higher risk of bleeding compared with laparoscopic surgery; Vaginal or Laparoscopic technique preferred for people who are obese |
| Vaginal hysterectomy | Shortest operation time; Short recovery period and discharge from hospital; Less pain medication and lower hospital costs compared with laparoscopic technique; Lowest cost | Limited by the size of the uterus and previous surgery; Limited ability to evaluate the fallopian tubes and ovaries |
| Laparoscopic supracervical hysterectomy (subtotal hysterectomy) | Unclear if subtotal approach leads to a reduction in pelvic organ prolapse in the long-term; No evidence that this technique improves sexual function or reduces operative risk of urinary or bowel damage; Faster return to normal activities | Women must have regular cervical cancer screening following surgery; Possibility of cyclical bleeding following subtotal approach |
| Laparoscopic-assisted vaginal hysterectomy (LAVH) | Possible with a larger uterus, depending on the surgeon's skills; Combination with reduction operations are possible | Higher cost than vaginal approach; Malignancies can only be removed by this approach if they are intact; Not suggested for people with cardiopulmonary disease |
| Total laparoscopic hysterectomy | Short inpatient treatment duration compared with abdominal; Allows the possibility to diagnose and treat other pelvic diseases; Quicker return to normal activities compared with abdominal; Less bleeding, fevers, infections compared with abdominal surgery; Associated with a high quality of life in the long term, compared with abdominal | Increased length of surgery; Requires a high degree of laparoscopic surgical skills; May have a higher risk of bladder or ureter injury |
| Single-port laparoscopic hysterectomy / mini laparoscopic hysterectomy | Improved cosmetic outcomes compared with conventional laparoscopic hysterectomy; More research required | No significant clinical improvements compared with conventional laparoscopic hysterectomy |
| Robotic-assisted hysterectomy | May result in shorter hospital stays; More research required | Similar complication rate compared with conventional laparoscopic; Longer surgical times; Increased cost; More research required |

== Incidence ==
=== Canada ===
In Canada, the number of hysterectomies between 2008 and 2009 was almost 47,000. The national rate for the same timeline was 338 per 100,000 population, down from 484 per 100,000 in 1997. The reasons for hysterectomies differed depending on whether the woman was living in an urban or rural location. Urban women opted for hysterectomies due to uterine fibroids and rural women had hysterectomies mostly for menstrual disorders.

=== United States ===
Hysterectomy is the second most common major surgery among women in the United States (the first is cesarean section). In the 1980s and 1990s, this statistic was the source of concern among some consumer rights groups and puzzlement among the medical community, and brought about informed choice advocacy groups like Hysterectomy Educational Resources and Services (HERS) Foundation, founded by Nora W. Coffey in 1982.

According to the National Center for Health Statistics, of the 617,000 hysterectomies performed in 2004, 73% also involved the surgical removal of the ovaries. There are currently an estimated 22 million women in the United States who have undergone this procedure. Nearly 68 percent were performed for benign conditions such as endometriosis, irregular bleeding, and uterine fibroids. Such rates being highest in the industrialized world has led to the controversy that hysterectomies are being largely performed for unwarranted reasons. More recent data suggests that the number of hysterectomies performed has declined in every state in the United States. From 2010 to 2013, there were 12 percent fewer hysterectomies performed, and the types of hysterectomies were more minimally invasive in nature, reflected by a 17 percent increase in laparoscopic procedures.

=== United Kingdom ===
In the UK, 1 in 5 women is likely to have a hysterectomy by the age of 60, and ovaries are removed in about 20% of hysterectomies.

=== Germany ===
The number of hysterectomies in Germany has been constant for many years. In 2006, 149,456 hysterectomies were performed. Additionally, of these, 126,743 (84.8%) successfully benefited the patient without incident. Women between the ages of 40 and 49 accounted for 50 percent of hysterectomies, and those between the ages of 50 and 59 accounted for 20 percent. In 2007, the number of hysterectomies decreased to 138,164. In recent years, the technique of laparoscopic or laparoscopically assisted hysterectomies has been raised into the foreground.

=== Denmark ===
In Denmark, the number of hysterectomies from the 1980s to the 1990s decreased by 38 percent. In 1988, there were 173 such surgeries per 100,000 women, and by 1998, this number had been reduced to 107. The proportion of abdominal supracervical hysterectomies in the same period grew from 7.5 to 41 percent. A total of 67,096 women underwent hysterectomy during these years.

== See also ==
- List of surgeries by type
