= Postoperative hematoma =

Postoperative hematomas are a cutaneous condition characterized by a collection of blood below the skin, and result as a complication following surgery.

== See also ==
- Subungual hematoma
- List of cutaneous conditions
