= James Lafayette =

Irish portrait photographer (1853–1923)

- Born: 22 January 1853; Dublin, Ireland
- Died: 20 August 1923 (aged 70); Bruges, Belgium
- Other name: James Stack Lauder

James Stack Lauder (22 January 1853–20 August 1923), known professionally as James Lafayette, was an Irish portrait photographer who was managing director of Lafayette Ltd, a company in Dublin specialising in society photographs, from 1898 to 1923. In 1887, he became the first Irish photographer to be granted a royal warrant.

== Early life and family ==
James Stack Lauder was born on 22 January 1853 in Dublin. His parents were Edmond (sometimes Edmund) Stanley (c.1824–91) and his wife, Sarah Harding Lauder (née Stack, c.1828–1913). He had five brothers and four sisters. The family lived at 42 Blessington Street. The Lauder family came from Tisaran, near Banagher, King's County (now County Offaly).

Edmond Lauder set up a photographic studio with a partner in the 1850s, trading as the Lauder Brothers, working with glass ambrotype. The Lauder Brothers eventually had 3 studios in Dublin, producing "carte-de-visite".

== Career ==
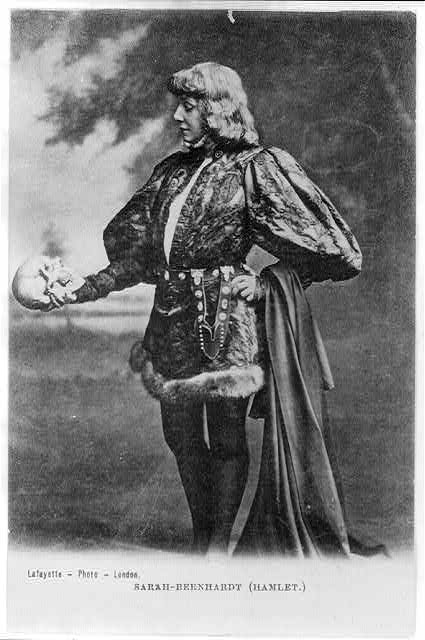
Sarah Bernhardt as Hamlet, with Yorick's skull. (Photographer: James Lafayette. c. 1885–1900).

Lauder studied art and painting in France and Germany but was unsuccessful as a painter and began working in a photographic studio in Berlin. He returned to Dublin and set up his own studio at 30 Westmoreland Street in 1880 with his brother, Edmond Stanley Lauder junior. The branded it as a "maison de photographie Française" and Lauder took the name Monsieur Jacques Lafayette "late of Paris".

Lauder quickly built a strong reputation as a portrait photographer for the upper classes in Dublin. He also sent his work to London and Paris to be exhibited at exhibitions, winning numerous medals. He was elected a member of the Photographic Society of Great Britain in 1884. He was invited to photograph Queen Victoria in 1887, and was granted the royal warrant as "Her Majesty's photographer in Dublin". This led to him receiving numerous other commissions with members of the royal family. His 1885 photograph of the princess of Wales sold 60,000 copies.

He also became a notable for his illustrative photography. Over time, he was critiqued for over-retouching his negatives. However, by 1891 he opened branches in Glasgow and Manchester, with his brother George working in the Glasgow branch. He adopted electrical light in his studios from 1891 along with air conditioning. He and his brother Edmond dissolved their partnership in January 1895, and Lauder left for London to set up another branch there in 1897.

== Marriage and death ==
Lauder initially lived on Blessington Street, next door to his parents. In 1887, he moved to Sunnyside, Vico Road, Dalkey, and then to Glencairn House, Harbour Road in 1890. After he moved to London he married Annie Dinnette, the daughter of Felix Pierre Dinnette, an artist. Lauder died on 20 August 1923 in Bruges, Belgium.

== Legacy and collections ==
The Lafayette firm continued into the early 20th century, publishing portraits, and photographs featured in periodicals. After the business went into decline, it was sold in the early 1952 and ceased trading in 1962. The photographic studio, Lafayette, still operates in Dublin. Lauder's Lane off Burrow Road, Sutton is named for Edmond Stanley Lauder junior.

While thousands of images were credited to Lafayette studios, only those 649 photographs which were registered for copyright bear his signature as author. These are now held in the Public Record Office, in Kew, London. The Lafayette Collection at London's Victoria & Albert Museum consists of 3,500 glass plate and celluloid negatives. A further collection of 30,000 to 40,000 nitrate negatives is at London's National Portrait Gallery. Further collections are in the Royal Archives at Windsor Castle; and in private hands in Dublin.

== Notes and references ==
- Anon, 1990. V&A. Brief history of the Lafayette Studio Retrieved: 5 January 2008. London: Victoria & Albert Museum.
- Meadows, Jane. 1990. V&A. James Lafayette biography Retrieved: 5 January 2008. London: Victoria & Albert Museum.
- Meadows, Jane. 2004. "Lauder, James Stack (1853–1923)", Oxford Dictionary of National Biography. Oxford: Oxford University Press. Online edition Retrieved: 6 January 2008.
