= Wertheim–Meigs operation =

- Cutting of the peritoneum to separate the uterus from the abdominal wall.
- Specialty: Surgical oncology

The Wertheim–Meigs operation (named after Ernst Wertheim and Joe Vincent Meigs) is a surgical procedure for the treatment of cervical cancer performed by way of an abdominal incision.

== History ==
The German surgeon Wilhelm Alexander Freund undertook the first ever abdominal extirpation of a cancerous uterus on January 30, 1878. The first radical hysterectomy operation was described by John G. Clark, resident gynecologist under Howard Kelly at the Johns Hopkins Hospital in 1895. In 1898, Ernst Wertheim, a Viennese physician, developed the radical total hysterectomy with removal of the pelvic lymph nodes and the parametrium. In 1905, he reported the outcomes of his first 270 patients. The operative mortality rate was 18%, and the major morbidity rate was 31%. In 1912, Wertheim reported on his first 500 operations and had his name assigned to the operation. In 1944, Meigs repopularized the surgical approach when he developed a modified Wertheim operation with removal of all pelvic nodes. Meigs reported a survival rate of 75% for patients with stage I disease and demonstrated an operative mortality rate of 1% when these procedures were performed by a specially trained gynecologist.

== Scope and indications ==
The Wertheim–Meigs operation is used to treat stage IA2, IB1, IB2 and IIA cervical cancers, stage II adenocarcinomas of the endometrium, upper vaginal carcinomas, uterine or cervical sarcomas, and other rare malignancies confined to the area of the cervix, uterus, and/or upper vagina. It is one of the most comprehensive gynecological interventions. It consists of the following measures:

- Radical hysterectomy, the total removal of the uterus and the ligaments that hold it in place in the pelvis
- Lymphadenectomy with removal of the connective and adipose tissue including the pelvic lymph nodes on both sides in the course of the common iliac, external iliac and internal iliac arteries. .
- Removal of the surrounding vaginal tissue from the obturator foramen to the pelvic floor.

The ovaries and fallopian tubes are typically left intact, although this decision is made on an individual basis.

== Complications ==
The morbidity associated with the Wertheim–Meigs operation is substantial. The most important complications are ureteral, ureterovaginal, and vesicovaginal fistulae, appearing during the immediate postoperative convalescence period or later mainly in patients who received subsequent radiotherapy. Other complications are described: intraoperative hemorrhage due to pelvic large vessel lesion, ureter or bladder accidental section, abdominal wall dehiscence, ureteral obstruction causing hydronephrosis and renal exclusion, disorders such as urinary incontinence, pollakiuria, vesical atony, often accompanied by urinary tract infection and hematuria.
