= Mathieu Reverdin =

French ice hockey player

- Born: July 22, 1987 (age 39) Gleizé, France

Mathieu Reverdin (born 22 July 1987 in Gleizé, France) is a former professional ice hockey player.

== Career ==
Reverdin made his professional debut for CSG Strasbourg in 2005 after one year with Geneva's Servette junior squad. He played two years in Strasbourg before moving to the Lyon Hockey Club in 2007. In 2009, he signed for Briançon Diables Rouges in Ligue Magnus. In 2010, he came back to the Lyon Hockey Club. He retired from hockey after the 2010-11 season.

== Playing style ==
Reverdin is tall but light at only 187 cm and 82 kg and he plays right-handed.
