= Reverdin needle =

Surgical instrument designed to pass through surgical sutures

- Specialty: surgery
- Intervention: suturing
- Inventor(s): Jaques-Louis Reverdin
- [edit on Wikidata]

The Reverdin needle is a surgical instrument designed to pass through a surgical suture and is named after the Swiss surgeon Jacques-Louis Reverdin. Over time, several modifications have been made to the needle and its name.
