= Wound dehiscence =

Rupture of a wound along a surgical incision

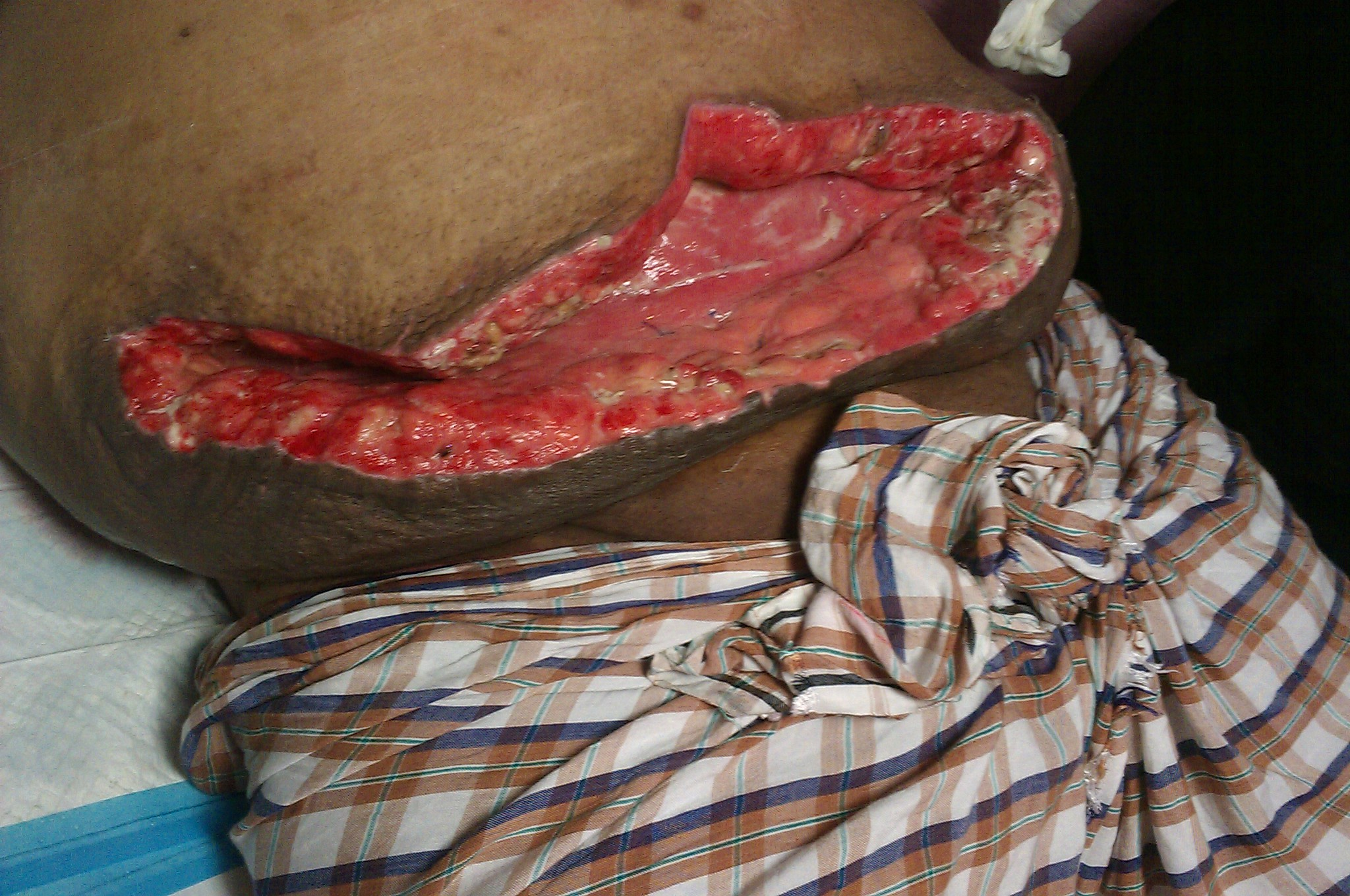
Wound dehiscence following an inguinal hernia repair.

Wound dehiscence is a surgical complication in which a wound ruptures along a surgical incision. Risk factors include age, collagen disorder such as Ehlers–Danlos syndrome, diabetes, obesity, poor knotting or grabbing of stitches, and trauma to the wound after surgery.

== Signs ==
Signs of dehiscence can include bleeding, pain, inflammation, fever, or the wound opening spontaneously. An internal surgical wound dehiscence can occur internally, as a consequence of hysterectomy, at the site of the vaginal cuff.

== Cause ==
A primary cause of wound dehiscence is sub-acute infection, resulting from inadequate or imperfect aseptic technique. Coated suture, such as Vicryl, generally breaks down at a rate predicted to correspond with tissue healing, but is hastened in the presence of bacteria. In the absence of other known metabolic factors which inhibit healing and may have contributed to suture dehiscence, subacute infection should be suspected, and the protocol for obtaining wound cultures followed. Dehiscence can also be caused by inadequate undermining (cutting the skin away from the underlying tissues) of the wound during surgery, excessive tension on the wound edges caused by the act of lifting or straining, or the wound being located on a highly mobile or high-tension area such as the back, shoulders or legs.

Individuals with Ehlers–Danlos syndrome also commonly experience wound dehiscence. Risk factors for dehiscence can include any of the above, as well as obesity, smoking, previous scarring, surgical error, cancer, chronic use of corticosteroids and increased abdominal pressure. A very common cause is also use of nicotine in any form.

== Prevention ==
Dehiscence can be prevented through adequate tissue undermining to reduce stress on the wound edges, avoiding heavy lifting and speeding healing through adequate nutrition, controlling diabetes, and avoiding certain medications such as corticosteroids. Sterile strips may also be used to cover skin sutures for up to a week.

== Treatment ==
Once wound dehiscence occurs, it can be treated by allowing granulation, re-cutting and suturing the edges, and providing prophylactic antibiotics. Exposure to the air, debridement, and, if indicated, frequent dressing changes also help.
