= Jaques-Louis Reverdin =

Swiss surgeon (1842–1929)

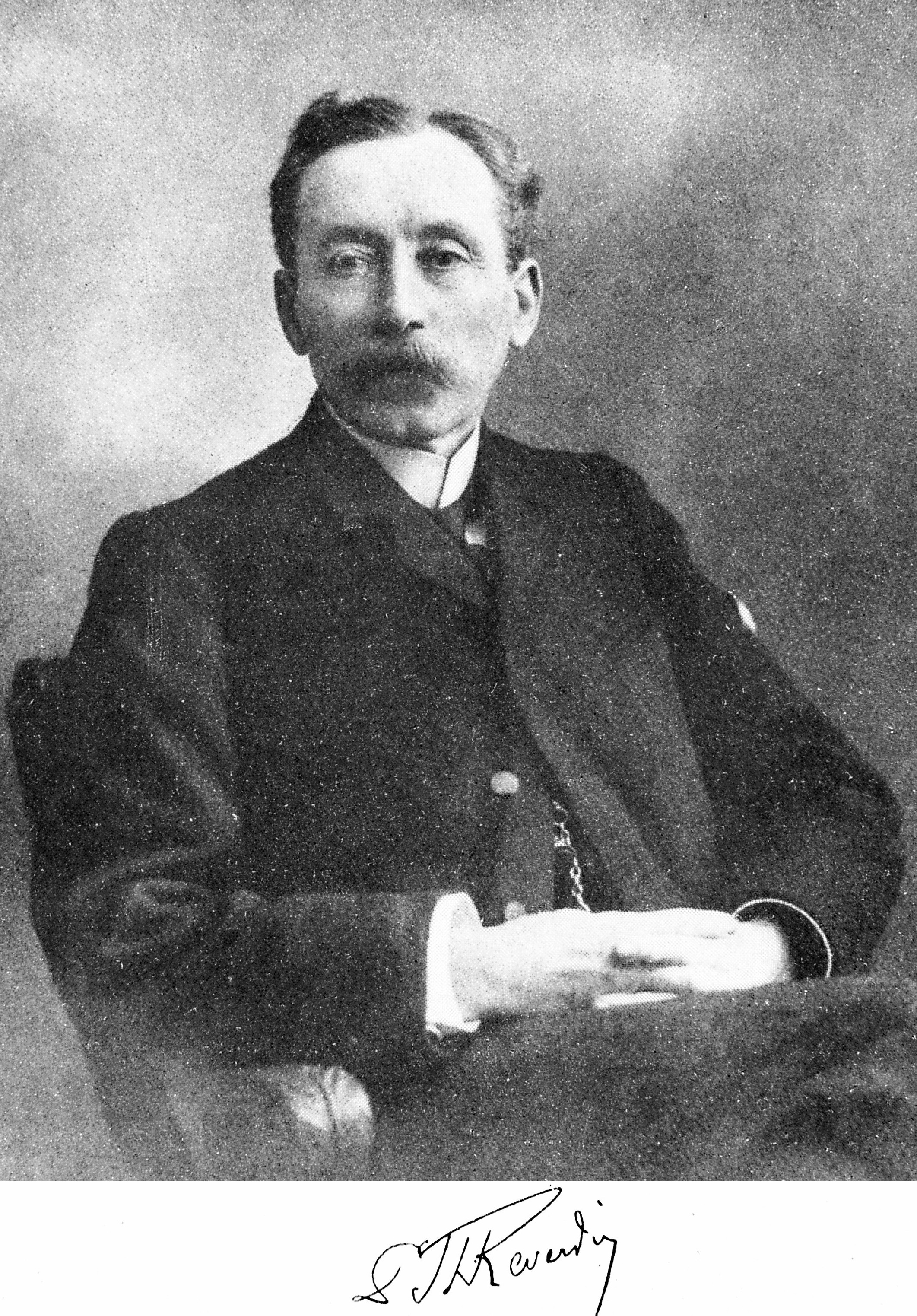
Jaques-Louis Reverdin

Jaques-Louis Reverdin (28 August 1842 – 9 January 1929) was a Swiss surgeon who was a native of Cologny.

He studied at the University of Paris, becoming an interne of hospitals in 1865. In 1869 he became an assistant to Jean Casimir Félix Guyon (1831–1920) in the surgical department at the Hôpital Necker in Paris. Afterwards he moved to Geneva, where he eventually became chief surgeon at the Hôpital Cantonal de Geneve, and a professor at the University of Geneva.

In 1869, Reverdin performed the first "fresh skin" allograft. The eponymous "Reverdin graft", also known as a "pinch graft", is a procedure for removing tiny pieces of skin from a healthy area of the body and seeding them in a location that needs to be covered. His name is also associated with a specialized surgical instrument known as a "Reverdin needle".

In 1882, with his cousin and assistant Auguste Reverdin (1848–1908), he observed that myxedema occurred as a delayed complication when the thyroid gland is surgically removed. He documented his findings in an article titled Note sur vingt-deux opérations de goitre. On 13 September 1882 he presented his observations to the Medical Society of Geneva.

He retired in 1910 and dedicated himself to the study of butterflies. The Reverdin's blue butterfly is named after him.

He died in Pregny on 9 January 1929.

== Bibliography ==
- Art and Medicine.com about "Note sur vingt-deux opérations de goitre"
- History of Organ and Tissue Transplantation
- Parts of this article are based on a translation of an equivalent article at the French Wikipedia.
- "Reverdin, Jaques Louis" in German, French and Italian in the online Historical Dictionary of Switzerland.
