= Joe Vincent Meigs =

Joe Vincent Meigs (October 24, 1892, Lowell, Massachusetts – October 24, 1963), was an American obstetrician and gynecologist. Meigs was a grandson of Captain Josiah Vincent Meigs Sr., who invented an experimental steam monorail known as the Meigs single-track elevated railroad.

Meigs syndrome is named after him. He graduated from Princeton University and Harvard Medical School.

== See also ==
- Mary Ann Vincent
