= Uterine myomectomy =

Surgical removal of uterine fibroid

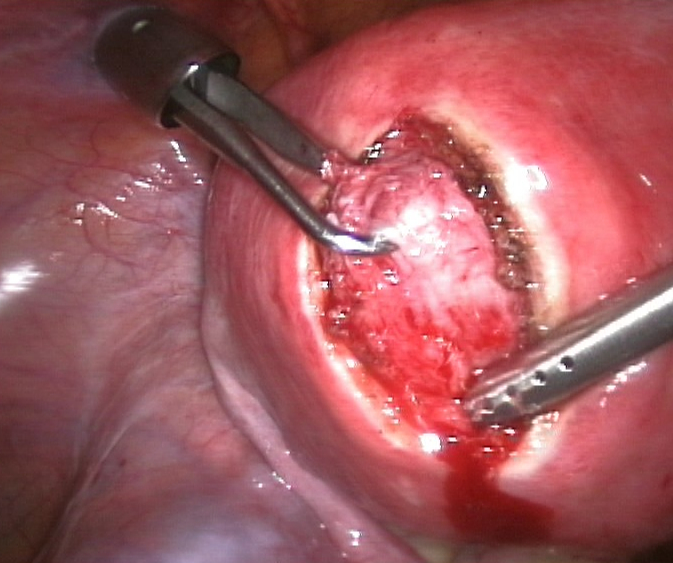
- A laparoscopic myomectomy: The uterus has been incised and the myoma is held and about to be shelled out.
- Other names: Fibroidectomy
- ICD-9-CM: 68.29

Myomectomy, sometimes also called fibroidectomy, refers to the surgical removal of uterine leiomyomas, also known as fibroids. In contrast to a hysterectomy, the uterus remains preserved and the woman retains her reproductive potential. It still may impact hormonal regulation and the menstrual cycle.

== Indications ==
The presence of a fibroid does not mean that it needs to be removed. Removal is necessary when the fibroid causes pain, pressure, or abnormal bleeding, or interferes with reproduction. The fibroids needed to be removed are typically large in size, or growing at certain locations such as bulging into the endometrial cavity causing significant cavity distortion.

Treatment options for uterine fibroids include observation or medical therapy, such a GnRH agonist, hysterectomy, uterine artery embolization, and high-intensity focused ultrasound ablation.

== Procedure ==
A myomectomy can be performed in a number of ways, depending on the location, size and number of lesions and the experience and preference of the surgeon. Either a general or a spinal anesthesia is administered.

=== Laparotomy ===
Traditionally a myomectomy is performed via a laparotomy with a full abdominal incision, either vertically or horizontally. Once the peritoneal cavity is opened, the uterus is incised, and the lesion(s) removed. The open approach is often preferred for larger lesions. One or more incisions may be set into the uterine muscle and are repaired once the fibroid has been removed. Recovery after surgery takes six to eight weeks.

=== Laparoscopy ===
Using the laparoscopic approach the uterus is visualized and its fibroids located and removed. Studies have suggested that laparoscopic myomectomy leads to lower morbidity rates and faster recovery than does laparotomic myomectomy. As with hysteroscopic myomectomy, laparoscopic myomectomy is not generally used on very large fibroids. A study of laparoscopic myomectomies conducted between January 1990 and October 1998 examined 106 cases of laparoscopic myomectomy, in which the fibroids were intramural or subserous and ranged in size from 3 to 10 cm.

=== Hysteroscopy ===
A fibroid that is located in a submucous position (that is, protruding into the endometrial cavity) may be accessible to hysteroscopic removal. This may apply primarily to smaller lesions as pointed out by a large study that collected results from 235 patients with submucous myomas who were treated with hysteroscopic myomectomies; in none of these cases was the fibroid greater than 5 cm. However, larger lesions have also been treated by hysteroscopy. Recovery after hysteroscopic surgery is but a few days.

== Complications and risks ==
Complications of the surgery include the possibility of significant blood loss leading to the need for blood transfusion, the risk of adhesion or scar formation around the uterus or within its cavity, and the possible need later to deliver via cesarean section.

It may not be possible to remove all lesions, nor will the operation prevent new lesions from growing. Development of new fibroids will be seen in 42–55% of patients undergoing a myomectomy.

It is well known that myomectomy surgery is associated with a higher risk of uterine rupture in later pregnancy. Thus, women who have had myomectomy (with the exception of small submucosal myoma removal via hysteroscopy, or largely pedunculated myoma removal) should get Cesarean delivery to avoid the risk of uterine rupture that is commonly fatal to the fetus.

To reduce bleeding during myomectomy, the use of misoprostol in the vagina and the injection of vasopressin into the uterine muscle are both effective. There is less evidence supporting the usefulness chemical dissection (such as with mesna), vaginal insertion of dinoprostone, a gelatin–thrombin matrix, tranexamic acid, infusion of vitamin C, infiltration of a mixture of bupivacaine and epinephrine into the uterine muscles, or the use of a fibrin sealant patch.

== Myomectomy during pregnancy ==
Leiomyomata tend to grow during pregnancy but only the large ones causing endometrial cavity distortion could interfere with the growing pregnancy directly. Generally, surgeons tend to stay away from operative interventions during the pregnancy because of the risk of haemorrhage and the concern that the pregnancy may be interrupted. Also, after a pregnancy, myomas tend to shrink naturally. However, in selected cases myomectomy may become necessary during pregnancy, or also at the time of a caesarean section to gain access to the baby.

== Research ==
For removing uterine fibroids, myomectomy and uterine artery embolisation seem to be equally effective in improving quality of life, as measured 4 years after surgery.
