= Mineral deficiency =

- Specialty: Endocrinology

Mineral deficiency is a lack of dietary minerals, the micronutrients that are needed for an organism's proper health. The cause may be a poor diet, impaired uptake of the minerals that are consumed, or a dysfunction in the organism's use of the mineral after it is absorbed. These deficiencies can result in many disorders including anemia and goitre. Examples of mineral deficiency include zinc deficiency, iron deficiency, and magnesium deficiency.

== Individual deficiency ==
Mineral	Symptoms & Diagnosis	Information
Calcium deficiency	Asymptomatic or, in severe cases, can have dramatic symptoms and be life-threatening. Symptoms of include numbness in fingers and toes, muscle cramps, irritability, impaired mental capacity and muscle twitching. Vitamin D related hypocalcemia may be associated with a lack of vitamin D in the diet, a lack of sufficient UV exposure, or disturbances in renal function. Low vitamin D in the body can lead to a lack of calcium absorption and secondary hyperparathyroidism (hypocalcemia and raised parathyroid hormone).	Parathyroid related or vitamin D related.
Chromium deficiency	Severely impaired glucose tolerance, weight loss, peripheral neuropathy and confusion.	The authorities in the European Union do not recognize chromium as an essential nutrient, those in the United States do, and identify an adequate intake for adults as between 25 and 45 μg/day, depending on age and sex. Dietary supplements containing chromium are widely available in the United States, with claims for benefits for fasting plasma glucose, hemoglobin A1C and weight loss. Reviews report the changes as modest, and without scientific consensus that the changes have a clinically relevant impact.
Copper deficiency	Neurological problems including myelopathy, peripheral neuropathy, and optic neuropathy. Blood symptoms of anemia and neutropenia.	Copper deficiency can manifest in parallel with vitamin B12 and other nutritional deficiencies. The most common cause of copper deficiency is a remote gastrointestinal surgery, such as gastric bypass surgery, due to malabsorption of copper, or zinc toxicity.
Fluorine deficiency	Increased dental caries and possibly osteoporosis	Fluorine is not considered to be an essential nutrient, but the importance of fluorides for preventing tooth decay is well-recognized, although the effect is predominantly topical.
iron deficiency	fatigue, dizziness/lightheadedness, pallor, hair loss, twitches, irritability, weakness, pica, brittle or grooved nails, hair thinning, pagophagia, restless legs syndrome	Iron deficiency may be caused by blood loss, inadequate intake, medications interfering with absorption, mechanical hemolysis from athletics, malabsorption syndromes, inflammation, and parasitic infections. In a 2014 U.S. government consumption survey and reported that for men and women ages 20 and older the average iron intakes were, respectively, 16.6 and 12.6 mg/day.
Iodine deficiency	Goiter, congenital iodine deficiency syndrome, and fibrocystic breast changes	In areas where there is little iodine in the diet, typically remote inland areas where no marine foods are eaten, iodine deficiency is common. It is also common in mountainous regions of the world where food is grown in iodine-poor soil. Prevention includes adding small amounts of iodine to table salt, a product known as iodized salt. Iodine compounds have also been added to other foodstuffs, such as flour, water and milk, in areas of deficiency.
Manganese deficiency	Skeletal deformation and inhibits the production of collagen in wound healing.	Manganese is a vital element of nutrition in very small quantities (adult male daily intake 2.3 milligrams).
Magnesium deficiency	Tiredness, generalized weakness, muscle cramps, abnormal heart rhythms, increased irritability of the nervous system with tremors, paresthesias, palpitations, low potassium levels in the blood, hypoparathyroidism which might result in low calcium levels in the blood, chondrocalcinosis, spasticity and tetany, migraines, epileptic seizures, The diagnosis is typically based on finding low blood magnesium levels (hypomagnesemia). basal ganglia calcifications and in extreme and prolonged cases coma, intellectual disability or death. Magnesium plays an important role in carbohydrate metabolism and its deficiency may worsen insulin resistance, a condition that often precedes diabetes, or may be a consequence of insulin resistance. Normal magnesium levels are between 0.6 and 1.1 mmol/L (1.46–2.68 mg/dL) with levels less than 0.6 mmol/L (1.46 mg/dL) defining hypomagnesemia. Specific electrocardiogram (ECG) changes may be seen.	Causes include low dietary intake, alcoholism, diarrhea, increased urinary loss, poor absorption from the intestines, and diabetes mellitus. A number of medications may also cause low magnesium, including proton pump inhibitors (PPIs) and furosemide.
Molybdenum deficiency	High blood methionine, low blood uric acid, and low urinary uric acid and sulfate concentrations.	The amount of molybdenum required is relatively small, and molybdenum deficiency usually does not occur in natural settings.
Potassium deficiency	Mild low potassium does not typically cause symptoms. Symptoms may include feeling tired, leg cramps, weakness, and constipation. Low potassium also increases the risk of an abnormal heart rhythm, which is often too slow and can cause cardiac arrest.	Causes of potassium deficiencyinclude vomiting, diarrhea, medications like furosemide and steroids, dialysis, diabetes insipidus, hyperaldosteronism, hypomagnesemia, and not enough intake in the diet. Normal potassium levels are between 3.5 and 5.0 mmol/L (3.5 and 5.0 mEq/L) with levels below 3.5 mmol/L defined as hypokalemia. It is classified as severe when levels are less than 2.5 mmol/L. Low levels may also be suspected based on an electrocardiogram (ECG). Hyperkalemia is a high level of potassium in the blood serum.
Selenium deficiency	Significant negative results, affecting the health of the heart, Keshan disease and the nervous system; contributing to depression, anxiety, and dementia; and interfering with reproduction and gestation.	People dependent on food grown from selenium-deficient soil may be at risk for deficiency.
Sodium deficiency	Mild symptoms include a decreased ability to think, headaches, nausea, and poor balance. Severe symptoms include confusion, seizures, and coma.	The causes of hyponatremia are typically classified by a person's body fluid status into low volume, normal volume, or high volume. Low volume hyponatremia can occur from diarrhea, vomiting, diuretics, and sweating. Normal volume hyponatremia is divided into cases with dilute urine and concentrated urine. Cases in which the urine is dilute include adrenal insufficiency, hypothyroidism, and drinking too much water or too much beer. Cases in which the urine is concentrated include syndrome of inappropriate antidiuretic hormone secretion (SIADH). High volume hyponatremia can occur from heart failure, liver failure, and kidney failure. Conditions that can lead to falsely low sodium measurements include high blood protein levels such as in multiple myeloma, high blood fat levels, and high blood sugar.
Zinc deficiency	Common symptoms include increased rates of diarrhea. Zinc deficiency affects the skin and gastrointestinal tract; brain and central nervous system, immune, skeletal, and reproductive systems.	Zinc deficiency in humans is caused by reduced dietary intake, inadequate absorption, increased loss, or increased body system use. The most common cause is reduced dietary intake. In the U.S., the Recommended Dietary Allowance (RDA) is 8 mg/day for women and 11 mg/day for men.

== See also ==
- Mineral (nutrient)
- Micronutrient deficiency
- Vitamin deficiency
- Metal toxicity for the inverse.
