= List of side effects of doxepin =

The antidepressant drug doxepin has been associated with a number of different adverse effects, including the following.

The incidence of these adverse effects is not totally known as the scarcity of well-designed clinical trials involving doxepin prohibits it. Side effects that are common (based on its pharmacology or the frequency of these side effects with related agents) appear with a * superscript whereas the serious side effects are in bold. Doxepin is licensed to be used in much smaller doses (viz., 3mg and 6 mg) in some countries, the side-effects profile of which may differ from this list.

- Nausea^{*}
- Dizziness^{*}
- Drowsiness^{*}
- Dry mouth^{*}
- Constipation^{*}
- Blurred vision^{*}
- Headache^{*}
- Urinary hesitancy^{*}
- Agitation^{*}
- Hypotension (low blood pressure)
- Hypertension (high blood pressure)
- Tachycardia (high heart rate)
- Skin rash
- Facial oedema
- Photosensitisation
- Urticaria (hives)
- Pruritus (itching)
- Indigestion
- Bone fractures
- Taste disturbances
- Diarrhoea
- Anorexia (weight loss)
- Aphthous stomatitis (canker sores)
- Gynaecomastia (swelling of the breasts in men)
- Galactorrhoea (lactation that is unassociated with breast feeding or pregnancy)
- Chills
- Fatigue
- Weakness
- Flushing
- Alopecia (hair loss)
- Eosinohpilia
- **Blood dyscrasias** (abnormalities in the cellular composition of blood)
- Increased liver function tests
- **Hyperpyrexia** (high fever ≥41.5 °C or 106.7 °F)
- **Seizures**
- Confusion
- Malaise
- Increased appetite^{*}
- Changes in ECG parameters (e.g. QRS & PR interval)
- Ataxia
- **Hallucinations**
- Paraesthesias
- Nervousness
- Numbness
- Tinnitus
- **Hepatitis** (liver swelling)
- **Exacerbation of asthma**
- Hepatic (liver) abnormalities
- **Urinary retention**
- Extrapyramidal symptoms
- Testicular swelling
- **Hyperglycaemia** (high blood sugar)
- **Hypoglycaemia** (low blood sugar)
- **Hyponatraemia** (low blood sodium)
- **Syndrome of inappropriate secretion of antidiuretic hormone** (SIADH)
- Closed-angle glaucoma
- Alzheimer's disease or dementia*
