= Cerebral salt-wasting syndrome =

- Other names: CSWS
- Specialty: Endocrinology

Cerebral salt-wasting syndrome (CSWS), also written cerebral salt wasting syndrome, is a rare endocrine condition featuring a low blood sodium concentration and dehydration in response to injury (trauma) or the presence of tumors in or surrounding the brain. In this condition, the kidney is functioning normally but excreting excessive sodium. The condition was initially described in 1950. Its cause and management remain controversial. In the current literature across several fields, including neurology, neurosurgery, nephrology, and critical care medicine, there is controversy over whether CSWS is a distinct condition, or a special form of syndrome of inappropriate antidiuretic hormone secretion (SIADH).

== Signs and symptoms ==
Signs and symptoms of CSWS include large amounts of urination (polyuria, defined as over three liters of urine output over 24 hours in an adult), high amounts of sodium in the urine, low blood sodium concentration, excessive thirst (polydipsia), extreme salt cravings, dysfunction of the autonomic nervous system (dysautonomia), and dehydration. Patients often self-medicate by consuming high amounts of sodium and by dramatically increasing their water intake. Advanced symptoms include muscle cramps, lightheadedness, dizziness or vertigo, feelings of anxiety or panic, increased heart rate or slowed heart rate, low blood pressure and orthostatic hypotension which can result in fainting. Other symptoms frequently associated with dysautonomia include headaches, pallor, malaise, facial flushing, constipation or diarrhea, nausea, acid reflux, visual disturbances, numbness, nerve pain, trouble breathing, chest pain, loss of consciousness, and seizures.

== Causes ==
Although the pathophysiology of CSWS is not fully understood, it is usually caused by neurological injury, most commonly aneurysmal subarachnoid hemorrhage. It is also reported after surgery for pituitary tumor, acoustic neuroma, calvarial remodeling, glioma and with infections including tuberculous meningitis, viral meningitis, metastatic carcinoma, and cranial trauma.

== Diagnosis ==
CSWS is a diagnosis of exclusion and may be difficult to distinguish from the syndrome of inappropriate antidiuretic hormone (SIADH), which develops under similar circumstances and also presents with hyponatremia. The main clinical difference is that of total fluid status of the patient: CSWS leads to a relative or overt low blood volume whereas SIADH is consistent with a normal or high blood volume (due to water reabsorption via the V2 receptor). If blood-sodium levels increase when fluids are restricted, SIADH is more likely. Additionally, urine output is classically low in SIADH and elevated in CSWS.

== Treatment ==
While CSWS usually appears within the first week after brain injury and spontaneously resolves in 2–4 weeks, it can sometimes last for months or years. In contrast to the use of fluid restriction to treat SIADH, CSWS is treated by replacing the urinary losses of water and sodium with hydration and sodium replacement. The mineralocorticoid medication fludrocortisone can also improve the low sodium level.

== History ==
In 1858, Claude Bernard first raised the possibility of a direct relationship between the central nervous system and renal excretion of osmotically active solutes. He found that a unilateral lesion in the reticular substance at the floor of the fourth ventricle produced a diuresis of chloride, but not glucose. Bernard reproduced this syndrome through renal denervation. Through medullary lesioning in animals, Jungmann and Meyer from Germany induced polyuria and increased urinary salt excretion in 1913. Water intake restriction did not stop the polyuria, and salt continued to be excreted in the urine despite. In 1936, McCance defined the consequences of salt depletion in normal human. Patients with extra-renal salt losses complicated by hyponatremia were found to be common-place, and consistent with McCance's description, they excreted urine virtually free of sodium.

Shortly after World War II, the flame photometer was developed. The availability of the flame photometer made clinical determinations of the serum sodium concentration possible. Berry, Barnes and Richardson shared the production of this new device to measure sodium and potassium in solution of biological materials by means of the flame photometer in 1945. Yale was one of the first medical centers to have that new device, the flame photometer, so some of the first published observations about hyponatremia came from Yale.

Almost a century after the pioneering work of Bernard in animals, Peters et al., in 1950, reported three patients seen at Yale New Haven Hospital with hyponatremia associated with varying cerebral pathologies and severe dehydration. In each patient, urine sodium losses persisted despite hyponatremia and a high-salt diet. All three patients were unable to prevent urinary sodium loss despite low serum sodium levels and no evidence of extrarenal sodium loss. Their hyponatremia responded to salt therapy. They postulated that this provided evidence of an extra-pituitary cerebral structure mediating normal sodium metabolism but were unsure of its location or mechanism of action. A subsequent paper from the group at Yale attributed hyponatremia in neurologic disease to SIADH.

The normal regulatory mechanism of renal adjustment of salt and water balance was better understood in 1950s. The responsibility for the maintenance of a normal volume and tonicity of the body fluids devolves on the kidneys. This modern concept of renal physiology described the transformation of a large volume of glomerular filtrate to a much smaller volume of bladder urine which has been altered. The proximal portion of renal tubule is largely responsible for the decrease in volume of the filtrate and, to less extent, for alterations in composition. However, it is in the distal tubule that induced fine adjustment of water and sodium balance. In 1953, Leaf et al., demonstrated that exogenous administration of the antidiuretic hormone vasopressin resulted in hyponatremia and a natriuresis dependent on water retention and weight gain. This was not "salt wasting"; it was a physiologic response to an expanded intravascular volume. Vasopressin-ADH administration to normal humans was shown to result in water retention and urinary loss of electrolytes (primarily sodium) in other studies at the time.

The term "cerebral salt wasting" (CSW) was coined by Cort in 1954. The title of a paper by Cort describing a patient with a thalamic glioma resulting in hydrocephalus and raised intracranial pressure (although it is prudent to note that the earlier-described work by Peters, Welt and colleagues in 1950 was presented in a paper entitled "A salt-wasting syndrome associated with cerebral disease"). This patient was hyponatremic and clinically dehydrated with initial salt therapy not reversing this. Salt restriction resulted in ongoing natriuria. Recommencement of salt therapy subsequently increased serum sodium. Treatment with adrenocorticotropic hormone (ACTH) and deoxycortone acetate (having potent mineralocorticoid activity) had no effect. The author postulated an external influence on renal function not adrenal or pituitary in origin. Unfortunately, the patient died three and a half weeks later in "circulatory failure with terminal shock". At autopsy, the pituitary and adrenal glands were normal. Given Bernard's ability to create a chloride diuresis without glycosuria though renal denervation, Cort postulated the existence of a neuronal connection between the hypothalamus and proximal tubule of the kidney influencing electrolyte reabsorption. In all above-described cases, there was evidence of hyponatremia and dehydration. In the ensuing years, however, hyponatremia in cerebral pathology was described without clinical or laboratory evidence of dehydration. Renal and adrenal function appeared intact, but, unlike in the earlier case of "cerebral salt wasting" described by Cort, an increase in renal absorption and plasma concentration of sodium occurred with administration of ACTH and deoxycortone acetate. A study on a 5-month-old female infant with diffuse cerebral damage and hyponatremia in 1957 suggested that on normal fluid intakes the child was unable to excrete solute-free water in a normal manner. This may represent the result of damage to the cerebral osmoreceptors as part of generalized brain damage. The data do not support the concept that the hyponatremia resulted from true salt-wasting, either cerebral or renal in mediation. If correction of such a state is desirable, the most useful therapeutic measure would appear to be limitation of the intake of fluid to slightly more than the amount needed to cover water expenditure from insensible losses, obligatory urine volume and growth requirements.

The term "cerebral hyponatremia" was suggested in the work of Epstein, et al. 1961. Inappropriate release of endogenous vasopressin is probably responsible for hyponatremia in tuberculous meningitis. Inability to excrete water normally is also a feature of the salt wasting of certain hyponatremic patients with pulmonary tuberculosis. Similarly, it has been suggested that inappropriate release of vasopressin is the cause of hyponatremia and renal salt wasting in certain diseases, including bronchogenic carcinoma, cerebral injuries, and malformations.

In 1981, Nelson et al. studied hyponatremia in neurosurgical patients, primarily subarachnoid hemorrhage, and found that isotopically measured blood volumes were contracted; he attributed this finding to cerebral salt wasting (CSW). Following these publications, the term "CSW" vanished from the literature for over two decades with hyponatremia in patients with cerebral pathology assumed to result from SIADH. Then, in 1981, a study of twelve neurosurgical patients mainly with SAH found ten to have decreased red blood cell mass, plasma volume, and total blood volume despite "fulfilling laboratory criteria" for SIADH. Other authors associated hyponatremia in subarachnoid hemorrhage with increased levels of natriuretic peptides, negative sodium balance, and low central venous pressure.

A valid diagnosis of "salt wasting" requires evidence of inappropriate urinary salt losses and a reduced "effective arterial blood volume". Unfortunately, there is no gold standard to define inappropriate urinary sodium excretion. "Effective arterial blood volume" is a concept, not a measurable variable; in fact, we often define it clinically by looking at urine sodium excretion.

William Schwartz (1922–2009) attended Duke University after serving in the US Army in World War II. He observed that sulfanilamide increased excretion of sodium in patients with heart failure. This observation was the basis for the discovery and development of modern diuretic drugs. Frederic Bartter (1914–1983) worked on hormones affecting the kidney that led to the discovery of syndrome of inappropriate antidiuretic hormone (SIADH) in 1957 and Bartter syndrome in 1963. Schwartz-Bartter syndrome is named after these two scientists. The first reports of hyponatremia and renal sodium loss corrected by fluid restriction in patients with bronchogenic carcinoma were published by Bartter. At that time, no direct measurement of vasopressin was done.
