= Osmostat =

Regulatory center in the hypothalamus

The osmostat is the regulatory center in the hypothalamus that controls the osmolality of the extracellular fluid. The area in the anterior region of the hypothalamus contains the osmoreceptors, cells that control osmolality via the secretion of antidiuretic hormone (ADH).

In neurological conditions such as epilepsy or paraplegia, the osmostat can be pathologically reset, secreting ADH at a lower osmolality, which may cause hyponatremia. A reset osmostat is also a feature of SIADH.
