= Hypotonic hyponatremia =

Lack of sodium in blood with a low plasma osmolality

Hypoosmolar hyponatremia
- Other names: Hypotonic hyponatremia
- Specialty: Hematology

Hypoosmolar hyponatremia is a condition where hyponatremia (low salt in the blood) (<135 mEq/L), is associated with a low plasma osmolality (blood is overall "watery")(<275 mOsm/kg). The term "hypotonic hyponatremia" is also sometimes used.

In this state, blood has less osmotic pressure than the surrounding tissue and extracellular fluid (ECF). As the cell membranes comprising the vascular endothelium are permeable to water but not sodium, the end result is a net movement of water out of the blood and into the surrounding tissue and ECF. This will, in turn, gradually dilute these extravascular fluids until they reach an equally low osmotic pressure and the net movement of water between them becomes zero.

Movement of water out of the vasculature has a number of consequences, particularly in the brain. The brain is soft and able to expand, but the surrounding skull is rigid and cannot. As water moves into the brain tissue, the brain will begin to swell until it fully occupies the cranial cavity, at which point it no longer has room for any more growth. With further water influx, the pressure inside the skull will rapidly rise; the pressure will keep building until either the physical pressure pushing water back into the blood is able to balance the osmotic pressure pushing water out or the brain begins to herniate out of the skull - a likely fatal occurrence.

Symptoms of hyponatremia exist on a gradient and depend on both how large the sodium deficit is - often broken down into mild, moderate, and severe, as well as the rate at which the deficit formed - acute versus chronic.

== Pathophysiology ==
Sodium is the dominant extracellular cation in blood and ECF, playing a major role in osmotic pressure regulation alongside its roles in a plethora of biochemical processes including solute transport and neural signaling. In order to maintain homeostasis, cells expend a significant fraction of their total energy supply to maintain the sodium-potassium gradient across their membranes; sodium is pumped out and potassium is pumped in. Since these are charged ions, they do not easily cross the lipophilic (nonpolar) cell membrane, unlike water which passes through the membrane freely through protein channels known as aquaporins.

Under normal conditions, the osmotic gradient across the cell membrane is effectively zero, as any other value would be quickly corrected through the unimpeded flow of water towards the more concentrated side. In patients with hyponatremia, the osmotic pressure outside of the cell becomes decreased (less negative - osmotic pressure is effectively an attractive force) relative to the inside the cell. The net result is that water will flow into the cells until the equilibrium is reestablished. This causes cells to swell.

Tissue swelling is particularly problematic in parts of the body that lack room for expansion - namely, the brain. Unlike most of the body, the brain is fully encased in a rigid skull that has a fixed volume. As the brain increases in volume, it will begin to fully occupy the skull, at which point it can no longer freely expand. If, by this point, the osmotic pressure of the brain tissue has not fully equalized, the osmotic pressure driving water inwards will start being countered by physical pressure applied by the surrounding skull. The increased pressure on the brain results in many adverse effects on neural function as blood and its contents become inhibited from entering the cells. This induces a local state of hypoxia as oxygen-rich blood cannot adequately reach the brain, resulting in neural disfunction. In the most extreme cases, the intracranial pressure becomes so severe that the brain is physically squeezed out of the skull through the foramen magnum, an typically fatal condition known as cerebral herniation.

== Cause ==
Hypotonic hyponatremia can have many causes that can be further classified by the overall fluid status of the body - hypovolemic (low), euvolemic (normal), and hypervolemic (high). The etiology and management of hyponatremia is dependent on the fluid status of the patient.

=== Hypovolemic ===
Hypovolemic hyponatremia causes mainly involve loss of fluid and salt. This loss can be caused by factors both internal and external to the kidney, the organ chiefly responsible for fluid balance. Differentiation between renal and extrarenal causes can be conducted through analysis of urine sodium content - in renal cases, the kidney fails to retain sodium, resulting in inappropriately elevated urine sodium. In extrarenal cases, the kidney appropriately reabsorbs sodium, resulting in a low urine sodium concentration.

- Extrarenal (urine sodium < 10)
  - Excessive sweating
  - Burns
  - Vomiting
  - Diarrhea
  - Poor oral intake
- Urinary loss (urine sodium > 20)
  - Diuretic drugs (especially thiazides)
  - Addison's disease
  - Cerebral salt-wasting syndrome
  - Other salt-wasting kidney diseases

=== Euvolemic ===
Euvolemic hyponatremias are mostly caused by conditions resulting in sodium being excreted from the body but when a patient consumes enough water to maintain their overall fluid status. These include:

- Polydipsia
- Syndrome of inappropriate antidiuretic hormone secretion
- Hypothyroidism
- Poor oral intake

=== Hypervolemic ===
Hypervolemic hyponatremia can be described as a dilutional condition in which excess water is retained in the body. Causes of this include:

- Congestive heart failure
- Hypothyroidism
- Adrenal Insufficiency
- Liver cirrhosis
- Nephrotic syndrome
- Psychogenic polydipsia
- Acute kidney injury
- Chronic kidney disease

== Signs and Symptoms ==
Symptoms of hyponatremia are often nonspecific, and depend on both severity and chronicity. In acute cases, patients may present with a range of neurological deficits including headache, fatigue, lethargy, confusion, memory impairment, seizures, and somnolence - the latter two indicated severe hyponatremia. Chronic cases of hyponatremia are usually more subtle, as the brain adapts to the increased osmotic pressure through excretion of various solutes thus preventing the marked intracranial pressure seen in acute cases. While formerly known as "asymptomatic hyponatremia" due to its subtle and often missed effects on exam, more recent literature suggests that even in these cases patients do still experience neurological deficits including decreased attention, disorientation, poor motor control, unstable gait, diminished reflexes, among other subtle changes.

== Diagnosis and Treatment ==
=== Diagnosis ===
Diagnosis of hypotonic hyponatremia is principally one of bloodwork and treatment involved restoration of sodium levels. Routine tests like the basic metabolic profile (BMP) will demonstrate low sodium concentration. Once low sodium is detected, the next step in diagnosis is to check overall blood osmolality. If this is also low, a diagnosis of hypotonic hyponatremia is made. From this point, it is essential to determine the chronicity of the hyponatremia. Cases in which a patient developed hyponatremia in less than 48 hours are classified as acute and can be corrected rapidly. Cases that occurred for longer than 48 hours are classified as chronic and require much more delicate correction to prevent a condition called Osmotic Demyelination Syndrome (ODS). Cases whose chronicity is unknown, as is usually the case since it is unlikely that a patient presenting from outside of a hospital setting to have had bloodwork done within the prior 48 hours, are considered chronic in regards to treatment.

=== Treatment ===
==== Overview of treatment ====
Treatment of hyponatremia is simple in principle but often quite complex in practice. The goal of treatment is to return to eunatremia, accomplished by administration of sodium and/or vasopressin receptor antagonists (vaptans); the concept of the latter is that of increasing water excretion to increase sodium concentration relative to total body water (TBW) and is an option in hypervolemic cases. In mild cases, sodium administration can be accomplished through oral intake, either through direct supplementation or increased dietary salt intake. Moderate and severe cases involve parenteral sodium administration through the use of an intravenous catheter (IV). IV sodium administration is a complicated process, as the risk of overly rapid correction is substantial.

Exact guidelines for the rate of sodium correction vary between institutions, with some, like a systemic review published in the Canadian Journal of Medicine recommending a limit of 12 mEq/day, a European expert panel advocating for a limit up to 10 mEq/L per day, a US expert panel recommending only 8 mEq/day in high risk cases, while others are even more conservative and may advocate for as low as 6 mEq/L per day.

==== Avoidance and management of overcorrection ====
It is recommended to treat moderate and severe cases in a hospital to enable close monitoring and treatment adjustment, particularly in severe cases. After the initial 5 mEq/L increase has been achieved, usually through bolus of hypertonic saline, further restoration of a patient's sodium status should be conducted slowly. 3 methods of achieving a safe sodium correction are identified, namely proactive, reactive, and rescue. Proactive approaches aim to prevent the overshoot entirely by using less aggressive rates of sodium administration and/or preemptive administration of desmopressin to limit the rate of water excretion from the patient. Reactive approaches are centered on halting further sodium increase after the desired level is achieved, usually through administration of D5W to replace any urinary water losses after the sodium has risen to the desired level. Rescue therapies describe the reversal of overcorrection - typically through a combination of desmopressin and D5W administration to increase TBW without any additional sodium and thus diluting the sodium currently present in the body.

==== Osmotic Demyelination Syndrome ====
ODS is the primary concern when attempting to correct sodium levels. While not a common complication, usually reported in less than 1% of hyponatremia cases, it is nonetheless a significant concern due to its severe, often irreversible, and sometimes fatal effects. ODS results from what is essentially the same mechanism as hyponatremic encephalopathy but in reverse. As described above, patients with chronic cases of hyponatremia undergo a process of osmotic balancing through the expulsion of organic osmoles from their brain cells. This is not a rapid process, and its reversal can take even longer. If a patient has already adapted to their lower osmotic state and experiences a rapid and significant increase in their sodium levels, the osmotic pressure gradient central to hyponatremia will become inverted. The same processes that previously drove excess water into the cells will now drive water out of them resulting in cells contracting and drying out. This causes a noninflammatory demyelination of brain neurons as they shrink and undergo apoptosis.

Clinically, the presentation of ODS can take a wide range of forms primarily based on where the lesions form. Central Pontine Myelinolysis (CPM) is the classic presentation and the original name of the syndrome. As its name suggests, this manifestation occurs when demyelination occurs within the central pons of the brain, a region of the brainstem that is responsible for communication between the cerebral cortex and spinal cord. This can result in various movement disorders including dysarthria, dysphagia, pupillary control, reflexes, and even Locked-In Syndrome or coma.

When lesions occur outside of the pons, the condition can be described as Extrapontine Myelinolysis (EPM). In cases of EPM, the symptoms have much greater variance and will be driven by where the lesions develop. These symptoms can be expected to mirror those of any other type of brain injury in their respective region. For example, lesions developing in the Prefrontal cortex would be expected to cause disinhibition and behavioral issues much like a prefrontal cortex injury whereas a lesion in Broca's area would likely cause Broca's aphasia similar to a stroke affecting the same region.

== Prognosis ==
The overall prognosis of patients presenting with hyponatremia is not easily described as there are many factors to consider. Short-term prognosis is naturally going to depend on why the hyponatremia has occurred, how severe it is, and how effectively it was corrected. Longer-term prognosis will depend on both the underlying cause of the hyponatremia and whether the patient develops ODS. While numerous studies have been published on the topic of long-term hyponatremia prognosis, most are single-center studies that focus on specific population subsets making it difficult to draw more generalized conclusions.
