= Compulsive drinking =

Compulsive drinking may refer to:

- Psychogenic polydipsia - compulsive drinking of water in the absence of physiological stimuli
- Potomania - compulsive drinking of beer
- Dipsomania - historical term for the compulsive drinking of alcohol
- Binge drinking
