= Isotonic hyponatremia =

- Specialty: Internal medicine

Isotonic hyponatremia is a form of hyponatremia with mOsm measured between 280 and 295. It can be associated with pseudohyponatremia, or with isotonic infusion of glucose or mannitol.

== Pseudohyponatremia ==
Certain conditions, such as extraordinarily high blood levels of lipid (hyperlipidemia/hypertriglyceridemia) or protein (hyperparaproteinemia), magnify the electrolyte exclusion effect. This interferes with the measurement of serum sodium concentration by certain methods, leading to an erroneously low measurement of sodium, or pseudohyponatremia. The methods affected are the flame-photometric and indirect (but not direct) ion-selective electrode assays. This is distinct from a true dilutional hyponatremia that can be caused by an osmotic shift of water from cells to the bloodstream after large infusions of mannitol or maltose-containing intravenous immunoglobulin. However, intravenous immunoglobulin infusion may lead to pseudohyponatremia by increasing viscosity.

It is associated with hyperlipidemia more frequently than with elevated protein.
