= Carbonic anhydrase 12 =

Enzyme found in humans

CA12
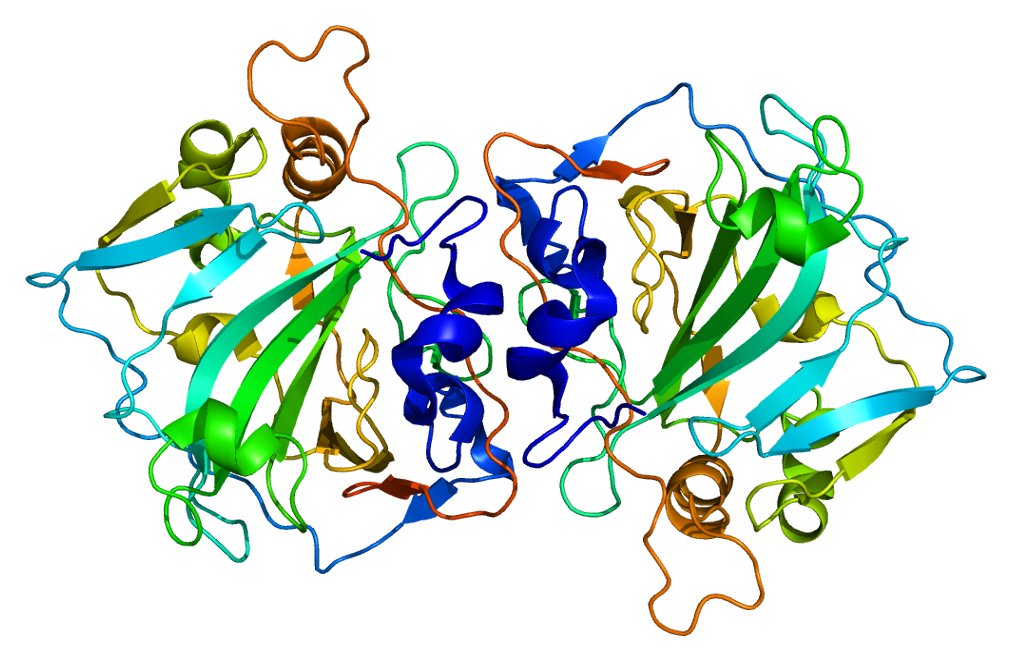

Identifiers
- Aliases: CA12, CAXII, HsT18816, CA-XII, T18816, carbonic anhydrase 12
- External IDs: OMIM: 603263; MGI: 1923709; GeneCards: CA12
Available structures
PDB	Ortholog search: PDBe RCSB
PDB	List of PDB id codes 1JCZ, 1JD0, 4HT2, 4KP5, 4KP8, 4Q0L, 4QJ0, 4QJO, 4QJW, 4WW8
Enzyme activity
EC #	BRENDA	ExPASy	KEGG	MetaCyc
4.2.1.1	↗	↗	↗	↗

Gene location (Human)
Chr.	Chromosome 15 (human)
Band	15q22.2	Start	63,321,378 bp
Band	15q22.2	End	63,381,846 bp

Gene location (Mouse)
Chr.	Chromosome 9 (mouse)
Band	9|9 C	Start	66,620,968 bp
Band	9|9 C	End	66,674,127 bp
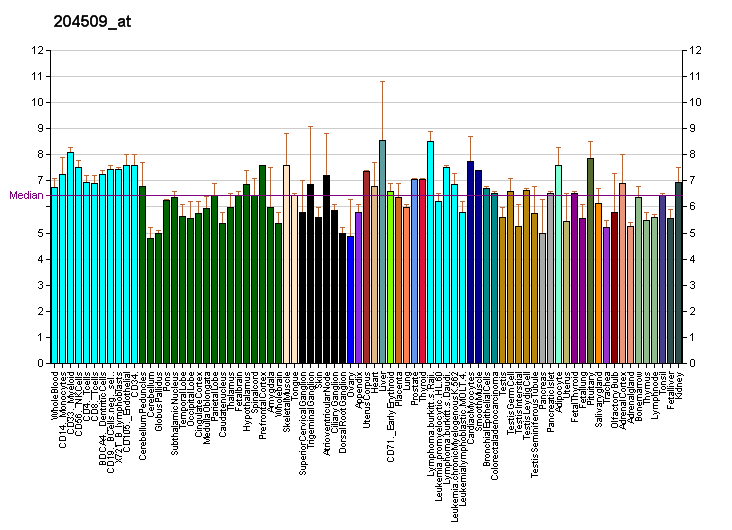

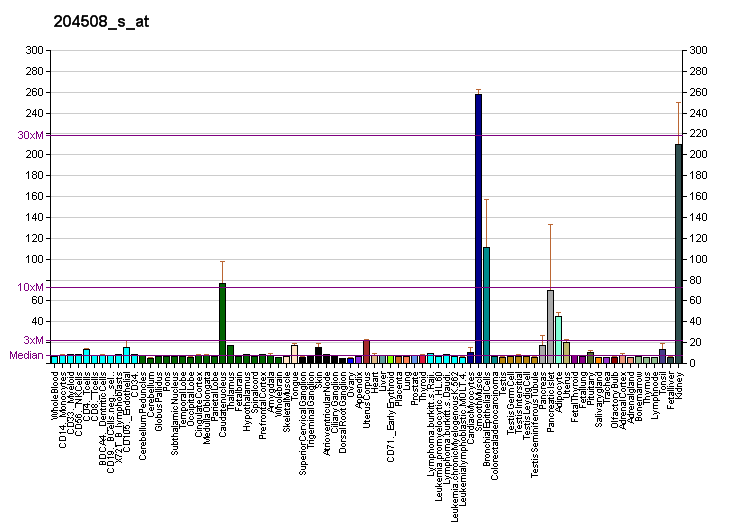

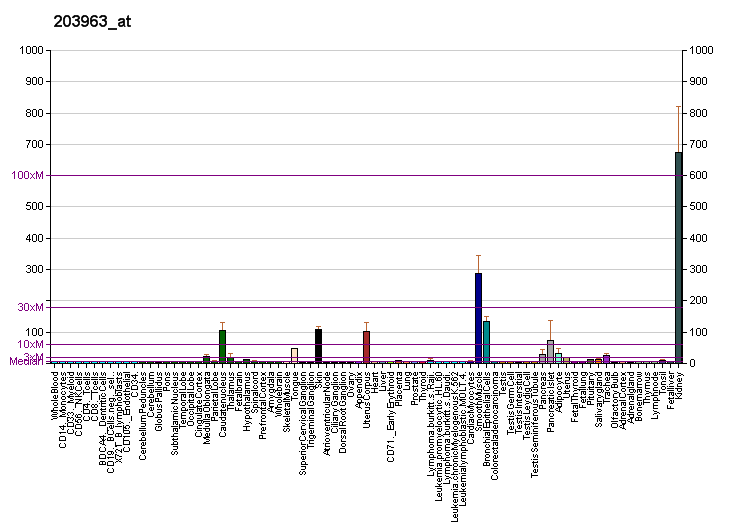
RNA expression pattern
Bgee	Human / Mouse (ortholog); Top expressed in: renal medulla; kidney tubule; skin of thigh; Epithelium of choroid plexus; mucosa of colon; mucosa of sigmoid colon; vulva; skin of hip; glomerulus; mucosa of pharynx / Top expressed in: choroid plexus of fourth ventricle; retinal pigment epithelium; Epithelium of choroid plexus; stria vascularis; right kidney; lip; parotid gland; human kidney; vestibular membrane of cochlear duct; submandibular gland; More reference expression data
BioGPS	More reference expression data
Gene ontology
Molecular function	carbonate dehydratase activity; zinc ion binding; lyase activity; metal ion binding; carbonic anhydrase
Cellular component	integral component of membrane; plasma membrane; membrane
Biological process	bicarbonate transport; chloride ion homeostasis
Sources:Amigo / QuickGO
Orthologs
Databases	NCBI: entry; OMA: entry
Species	Human	Mouse
Entrez	771	76459
Ensembl	ENSG00000074410	ENSMUSG00000032373
UniProt	O43570	Q8CI85
RefSeq (mRNA)	NM_206925; NM_001218; NM_001293642	NM_178396; NM_001306148
RefSeq (protein)	NP_001209; NP_001280571; NP_996808	NP_001293077; NP_848483
Location (UCSC)	Chr 15: 63.32 – 63.38 Mb	Chr 9: 66.62 – 66.67 Mb
PubMed search
- Wikidata
View/Edit Human	View/Edit Mouse

Carbonic anhydrase 12 is an enzyme that in humans is encoded by the CA12 gene.

== Function ==
Carbonic anhydrases (CAs) are a large family of zinc metalloenzymes that catalyze the reversible hydration of carbon dioxide. They participate in various biological processes, including respiration, calcification, acid-base balance, bone resorption, and the formation of aqueous humor, cerebrospinal fluid, saliva, and gastric acid. This gene product is a type I membrane protein highly expressed in normal tissues, such as kidney, colon and pancreas, and has been overexpressed in 10% of clear cell renal carcinomas. Two transcript variants encoding different isoforms have been identified for this gene.

== Pathology ==
Loss of function mutations in the CAXII gene result in defects in fluids and carbonate secretions in the following diseases:

1) Cystic fibrosis-like syndrome with normal cystic fibrosis transmembrane conductance regulator (CFTR) protein levels

2) Pancreatitis

3) Sjögren's syndrome

4) Xerostomia or dry mouth syndrome

== Molecular Basis of Cystic Fibrosis-like Syndrome ==
CAXII, with either the His121Gln or Glu143Lys mutation, localizes to basolateral membranes of polarized MDCK cells similar to the wild type enzyme, indicating no deleterious effect on subcellular location.

The Glu143Lys (E143K) loss-of-function variant of the CAXII gene is associated with a rare autosomal recessive condition named isolated hyperchlorhidrosis (carbonic anhydrase XII deficiency). Typically, this variant results in excessive sodium chloride loss, usually through sweating, and presents pathologically as episodic hyponatremic dehydration with bouts of vomiting and/or diarrhoea.

Generally, CAXII mutant enzymes show reduced activity. These observations make it difficult to explain the mechanism for the autosomal recessive disorder of hyponatremia, causing salt wasting in sweat due to mutant CAXII.

In a separate study, researchers observed that mutant enzyme activity is completely reduced at physiological concentrations of sodium chloride. Thus, loss of the function of CAXII in sweat glands and lungs is the molecular basis for cystic fibrosis patients with normal CFTR levels.

== High Impact Information on CAXII ==
Differential modulation of the active site environment of CAXII by cationic quantum dots and polylysine helps design CAXII specific activators and inhibitors of the enzyme. CAXII specific inhibition provides a tool to interfere with cell proliferation, resulting in cell apoptosis in T-cell lymphomas.

== Analytical, Diagnostic, and Therapeutic Context of CAXII ==
Serum CAXII levels should be applicable as a sero-diagnostic marker for lung cancer.
