= Management of heart failure =

Management of heart failure requires a multimodal approach. It involves a combination of lifestyle modifications, medications, and possibly the use of devices or surgery. It may be noted that treatment can vary across continents and regions.

== Lifestyle changes ==
People with heart failure, also known as congestive heart failure (CHF), are educated to undertake various non-pharmacological measures to improve symptoms and prognosis. Such measures include:

- Moderate physical activity, when symptoms are mild or moderate; or bed rest when symptoms are severe. In individuals with heart failure, increasing physical activity offers significant prognostic benefits for the secondary prevention of the condition.
- If sleep apnea is identified, treat with CPAP, BiPAP, dental appliances or surgery. Sleep apnea is an under-recognized risk factor for heart failure. Uncontrolled sleep apnea may increase the risk of heart failure by up to 140%.
- Weight reduction – through physical activity and dietary modification, as obesity is a risk factor for heart failure and left ventricular hypertrophy. Effective weight management has been shown to significantly improve the heart's functional status and reduce the risk of all-cause mortality.
- Monitor weight – this is a parameter that can easily be measured at home. Rapid weight increase is generally due to fluid retention. Weight gain of more than 2 pounds is associated with admission to the hospital for heart failure.
- Sodium restriction – excessive sodium intake may precipitate or exacerbate heart failure, thus a "no added salt" diet (60–100 mmol total daily intake) is recommended for patients with CHF.

=== Fluid restriction ===
According to a review in 2009, there is apparently no evidence of benefit of fluid restriction in patients with clinically stable heart failure otherwise receiving optimal pharmacological treatment. The same review suggested that clinicians still choosing to restrict fluid intake for patients with HF should consider an individualized fluid prescription, potentially based on patient body weight, sodium intake, and likelihood of adherence.

Generally water intake should be limited to 1.5 L daily or less in patients with hyponatremia, though fluid restriction may be beneficial regardless in symptomatic reduction.

== Medication ==
There is a significant evidence–practice gap in the treatment of CHF; particularly the underuse of ACE inhibitors and β-blockers and aldosterone antagonists which have been shown to provide mortality benefit. Treatment of CHF aims to relieve symptoms, to maintain a euvolemic state (normal fluid level in the circulatory system), and to improve prognosis by delaying progression of heart failure and reducing cardiovascular risk. Medications used include: diuretic agents, vasodilator agents, positive inotropes, ACE inhibitors, beta blockers, and aldosterone antagonists (e.g., spironolactone). SGLT2 inhibitors have also shown positive therapeutic outcomes. Some medications which increase heart function, such as the positive inotrope milrinone, lead to increased death, and are contraindicated.

=== Angiotensin-modulating agents ===
Unless contraindicated or not tolerated, ACE inhibitor (ACEi) therapy is recommended for all patients with systolic heart failure, irrespective of symptomatic severity or blood pressure. ACE inhibitors improve symptoms, decrease mortality and reduce ventricular hypertrophy. Angiotensin II receptor antagonist therapy (also referred to as AT_{1}-antagonists or angiotensin receptor blockers), particularly using candesartan, is an acceptable alternative if the patient is unable to tolerate ACEi therapy. ACEIs and ARBs decrease afterload by antagonizing the vasopressor effect of angiotensin, thereby decreasing the amount of work the heart must perform. It is also believed that angiotensin directly affects cardiac remodeling, and blocking its activity can thereby slow the deterioration of cardiac function.

A number of studies have been done to investigate whether ACEi plus ARB is better than an ACEi treatment alone in reducing death, disability or hospital admission in CHF with systolic dysfunction. The two largest studies were CHARM-Added and Val-HeFT. The conclusion of a Cochrane Database systematic review, which included these two studies and five others, was that combining ACEi treatment with ARB was not effective in reducing total mortality RR 0.98 [95% CI 0.9, 1.06] or cardiovascular mortality RR 0.93 [95% CI 0.84, 1.03] when compared with single therapy of an ACEi. Combined therapy did reduce HF-related hospital admissions with an absolute risk reduction of 4.4% but also increased discontinuation of medication due to adverse effects with an absolute risk increase of 3.7%. In plain English, 23 people would need to be treated to reduce one hospitalisation for HF while treating 27 people would harm one person with adverse effects. Thus, combined therapy does not improve mortality and may slightly increase morbidity.

=== Diuretics ===
Diuretic therapy is indicated for relief of congestive symptoms. Several classes are used, with combinations reserved for severe heart failure:

- Loop diuretics (e.g. furosemide, bumetanide) – most commonly used class in CHF, usually for moderate CHF
- Thiazide diuretics (e.g. hydrochlorothiazide, chlorthalidone, chlorthiazide) – may be useful for mild CHF, but typically used in severe CHF in combination with loop diuretics, resulting in a synergistic effect.
- Potassium-sparing diuretics (e.g. amiloride) – used first-line use to correct hypokalaemia.
  - Spironolactone is used as add-on therapy to ACEI plus loop diuretic in severe CHF.
  - Eplerenone is specifically indicated for post-MI reduction of cardiovascular risk.

If a heart failure patient exhibits a resistance to or poor response to diuretic therapy, ultrafiltration or aquapheresis may be needed to achieve adequate control of fluid retention and congestion. The use of such mechanical methods of fluid removal can produce meaningful clinical benefits in patients with diuretic-resistant heart failure and may restore responsiveness to conventional doses of diuretics.

Newly emerging evidence showed that glucocorticoids could be used in the treatment of decompensated heart failure to potentiate renal responsiveness to diuretics, especially in heart failure patients with refractory diuretic resistance with large dose of loop diuretics. Glucocorticoids induce a potent diuresis in heart failure because they could improve renal responsiveness to atrial natriuretic peptide by upregulating natriuretic peptide receptor A NPR-A expression in the renal inner medullary collecting duct, inducing a potent diuresis.

=== Beta blockers ===
Until recently (within the last 20 years), β-blockers were contraindicated in CHF, owing to their negative inotropic effect and ability to produce bradycardia – effects which worsen heart failure. However, current guidelines recommend β-blocker therapy for patients with systolic heart failure due to left ventricular systolic dysfunction after stabilization with diuretic and ACEI therapy, irrespective of symptomatic severity or blood pressure. As with ACEI therapy, the addition of a β-blocker can decrease mortality and improve left ventricular function. Several β-blockers are specifically indicated for CHF including: bisoprolol, carvedilol, nebivolol and extended-release metoprolol. The antagonism of β_{1} inotropic and chronotropic effects decreases the amount of work the heart must perform. It is also thought that catecholamines and other sympathomimetics have an effect on cardiac remodeling, and blocking their activity can slow the deterioration of cardiac function.

=== Positive inotropes ===
Digoxin (a mildly positive inotrope and negative chronotrope), once used as first-line therapy, is now reserved for control of ventricular rhythm in patients with atrial fibrillation; or where adequate control is not achieved with an ACEI, a beta blocker and a loop diuretic. There is no evidence that digoxin reduces mortality in CHF, although some studies suggest a decreased rate in hospital admissions. It is contraindicated in cardiac tamponade and restrictive cardiomyopathy.

The inotropic agent dobutamine is advised only in the short-term use of acutely decompensated heart failure, and has no other uses.

Phosphodiesterase inhibitors such as milrinone are sometimes utilized in severe cardiomyopathy. The mechanism of action is through inhibiting the breakdown and thereby increasing the concentration of cAMP similar to beta adrenoreceptor agonism, resulting in inotropic effects and modest diuretic effects.

=== Alternative vasodilators ===
The combination of isosorbide dinitrate/hydralazine is the only vasodilator regimen, other than ACE inhibitors or angiotensin II receptor antagonists, with proven survival benefits. This combination appears to be particularly beneficial in CHF patients with an African American background, who respond less effectively to ACEI therapy.

=== Aldosterone receptor antagonists ===
The RALES trial showed that the addition of spironolactone can improve mortality, particularly in severe cardiomyopathy (ejection fraction less than 25%.) The related medication eplerenone was shown in the EPHESUS trial to have a similar effect, and it is specifically labelled for use in decompensated heart failure complicating acute myocardial infarction. While the antagonism of aldosterone will decrease the effects of sodium and water retention, it is thought that the main mechanism of action is by antagonizing the deleterious effects of aldosterone on cardiac remodeling.

=== Recombinant neuroendocrine hormones ===
Nesiritide, a recombinant form of B-natriuretic peptide, is indicated for use in patients with acute decompensated heart failure who have dyspnea at rest. Nesiritide promotes diuresis and natriuresis, thereby ameliorating volume overload. It is thought that, while BNP is elevated in heart failure, the peptide that is produced is actually dysfunctional or non-functional and thereby ineffective.

=== Vasopressin receptor antagonists ===
Tolvaptan and conivaptan antagonize the effects of antidiuretic hormone (vasopressin), thereby promoting the specific excretion of free water, directly ameliorating the volume overloaded state, and counteracting the hyponatremia that occurs due to the release of neuroendocrine hormones in an attempt to counteract the effects of heart failure. The EVEREST trial, which utilized tolvaptan, showed that when used in combination with conventional therapy, many symptoms of acute decompensated heart failure were significantly improved compared to conventional therapy alone although they found no difference in mortality and morbidity when compared to conventional therapy.

=== SGLT2 inhibitors ===
SGLT2 inhibitors act by inhibiting sodium/glucose cotransporter 2 (SGLT2) located in the kidneys. While generally used for patients with type 2 diabetes research has shown that they can provide important cardiovascular benefits. Recent studies have shown that SGLT2 inhibitors can have a positive clinical effect in both heart failure with preserved ejection fraction (HFpEF) and heart failure with reduced ejection fraction (HFrEF). The 2023 Focused Update of the 2021 European Society of Cardiology (ESC) Guidelines for the diagnosis and treatment of both acute and chronic heart failure ranked SGLT2 inhibitors as a Class I recommendation in the management of HFpEF and heart failure with mildly reduced ejection fraction (HFmrEF). In the same guidelines ACEi/ARNI/ARB, MRA and β-blockers were classified as Class IIb for HFmrEF management. The 2022 AHA/ACC/HFSA Guideline for the Management of Heart Failure also recommended SGLT2 for HF treatment.

== Pharmacological contraindications ==
The pharmacological agents used in HF management can be contraindicated in pregnant individuals, patients with secondary pathologies or patients assuming other medications.

=== Pregnancy ===
Pregnant individuals with pre-existing heart failure might be advised to modify their current treatment to avoid foetal harm. According to both ESC and AHA guidelines ACEi, ARB, ARNI, MRA, ivabradine, vericiguat and SGLT2 inhibitors are all contraindicated in women with HF who are pregnant or planning to become pregnant. During pregnancy β-blockers should be continued using β1-selective blockers (usually metoprolol succinate).

== Devices ==
CRT: People with NYHA class III or IV, left ventricular ejection fraction (LVEF) of 35% or less and a QRS interval of 120 ms or more may benefit from cardiac resynchronization therapy (CRT; pacing both the left and right ventricles), through implantation of a bi-ventricular pacemaker. This treatment modality may alleviate symptoms, improving quality of life, and in some trials has been proven to reduce mortality.

The COMPANION trial demonstrated that CRT improved survival in individuals with NYHA class III or IV heart failure with a widened QRS complex on an electrocardiogram. The CARE-HF trial showed that patients receiving CRT and optimal medical therapy benefited from a 36% reduction in all-cause mortality and a reduction in cardiovascular-related hospitalization.

However, around one third of patients with LVEF of 35% of less have a QRS complex duration of 120 ms or more. In the remaining two thirds of patients (who have a QRS complex duration of 120 ms or less), CRT may actually be harmful.

CCM: Cardiac Contractility Modulation (CCM) is a treatment for patients with moderate to severe left ventricular systolic heart failure (NYHA class II–IV) which enhances both the strength of ventricular contraction and the heart's pumping capacity. The CCM mechanism is based on stimulation of the cardiac muscle by non-excitatory electrical signals (NES), which are delivered by a pacemaker-like device. CCM is particularly suitable for the treatment of heart failure patients with normal QRS complex duration (120 ms or less) and has been demonstrated to improve the symptoms, quality of life and exercise tolerance of heart failure patients. CCM is approved for use in Europe, but not currently in North America.

AICD: Patients with NYHA class II, III or IV, and LVEF of 35% (without a QRS requirement) may also benefit from an implantable cardioverter-defibrillator (ICD), a device that is proven to reduce all-cause mortality by 23% compared to placebo in patients who were already optimally managed on drug therapy. Patients with severe cardiomyopathy are at high risk for sudden cardiac death due to ventricular dysrhythmias. Although ICDs deliver electrical shocks to resynchronize heart rhythm which are potentially distressing to the patient, they have not been shown to affect quality of life. The number of (appropriate and inappropriate) shocks seems to be associated with a worse outcome. Although they are expensive, ICDs are potentially cost-effective in this setting.

LVAD: Another current treatment involves the use of left ventricular assist devices (LVADs). LVADs are battery-operated mechanical pump-type devices that are surgically implanted in the upper part of the abdomen. They take blood from the left ventricle and pump it through the aorta. LVADs are becoming more common and are often used in patients waiting for heart transplants.

== Surgery ==
The final option, if other measures have failed, is heart transplantation or (temporary or prolonged) implantation of an artificial heart. These remain the recommended surgical treatment options. However, the limited number of hearts available for transplantation in a growing group of candidates, has led to the development of alternative surgical approaches to heart failure. These commonly involve surgical left ventricular remodeling. The aim of the procedures is to reduce the ventricle diameter (targeting Laplace's law and the disease mechanism of heart failure), improve its shape and/or remove non-viable tissue. These procedures can be performed together with coronary artery bypass surgery or mitral valve repair.

If heart failure ensues after a myocardial infarction due to scarring and aneurysm formation, reconstructive surgery may be an option. These aneurysms bulge with every contraction, making it inefficient. Cooley and coworkers reported the first surgical treatment of a left ventricular aneurysm in 1958. They used a linear closure after their excision. In the 1980s, Vincent Dor developed a method using a circular patch stitched to the inside of the ventricle (the endoventricular circular patch plasty or Dor procedure) to close the defect after excision. Dor's approach has been modified by others and is today the preferred method for surgical treatment of incorrectly contracting (dyskinetic) left ventricle tissue, although a linear closure technique combined with septoplasty might be equally effective. The multicenter RESTORE trial of 1198 participants demonstrated an increase in ejection fraction from about 30% to 40% with a concomitant shift in NYHA classes, with an early mortality of 5% and a 5-year survival of 70%. It remains unknown if surgery is superior to optimal medical therapy. The STICH trial (Surgical Treatment for IschemiC Heart Failure) will examine the role of medical treatment, coronary artery bypass surgery and left ventricle remodeling surgery in heart failure patients. Results are expected to be published in 2009 and 2011.

The Batista procedure was invented by Brazilian surgeon Randas Batista in 1994 for use in patients with non-ischemic dilated cardiomyopathy. It involves removal of a portion of viable tissue from the left ventricle to reduce its size (partial left ventriculectomy), with or without repair or replacement of the mitral valve. Although several studies showed benefits from this surgery, studies at the Cleveland Clinic concluded that this procedure was associated with a high early and late failure rate. At 3 years only 26 percent were event-free and survival rate was only 60 percent. Most hospitals have abandoned this operation and it is no longer included in heart failure guidelines.

Newer procedures under examination are based on the observation that the spherical configuration of the dilated heart reduces ejection fraction compared to the elliptical form. Mesh-like constraint devices such as the Acorn CorCap aim to improve contraction efficacy and prevent further remodeling. Clinical trials are underway. Another technique which aims to divide the spherical ventricle into two elliptical halves is used with the Myosplint device.
