= Fluid restriction diet =

Diet limiting fluid consumption

A fluid restriction diet is a diet which limits the amount of daily fluid consumption. Besides beverages, many foods also include fluids which needs to be taken into consideration. A fluid-restrictive diet assists in preventing the build-up of fluids in the body. Reducing fluid intake can alleviate stress on the body and may reduce additional complications. A fluid restriction diet is generally medically advised for patients with "heart problems, renal disease, liver damage including cirrhosis, endocrine and adrenal gland issues, elevated stress hormones and hyponatremia". Patients with heart failure are recommended to restrict fluid intake down to 2 US quarts (1.9 L) per day.

Foods such as gelatin, ice cream, yogurt, soups, sauces and watery fruit need to be limited. It is recommended that patients on fluid restriction maintain a log to track daily fluid intake. Symptoms of fluid build up due to underlying heart issues include, increased blood pressure, difficulty breathing, shortness of breath, bloating, swelling and nausea.

Patients with terminal illness may refuse both nutrition and hydration.

== Effectiveness ==
Partial fluid restriction can be used as therapy, but has the disadvantages of being difficult to maintain, and it is often ineffective. Drugs causing increased diuresis (diuretics) is generally an alternative, and have less risk of causing decreased glomerular filtration rate through the kidneys and resultant decreased kidney function. Fluid restriction is occasionally a practice in management of heart failure. However, according to a scientific review in 2009, there is no evidence of benefit of fluid restriction in patients with clinically stable heart failure otherwise receiving optimal pharmacological treatment. Rather, diuretics are preferred in heart failure, mainly ACE inhibitors, with substantial evidence of improving survival and quality of life in heart failure patients. Theoretically, fluid restriction could also correct the electrolyte imbalance in hyponatremia, but again, diuretics, mainly vasopressin receptor antagonists, show better efficiency. Nevertheless, in hyponatremia secondary to SIADH, long-term fluid restriction (of 1,200–1,800 mL/day) in addition to diuretics is standard treatment.

== See also ==
- Drinking
- List of diets
