= Electrolyte imbalance =

Abnormality in the concentration of electrolytes in the body

Water–electrolyte imbalance
- Diagram of ion concentrations and charge across a semi-permeable cellular membrane.
- Specialty: Nephrology
- Causes: Malnutrition, dehydration, diarrhea, vomiting, etc.

Electrolyte imbalance, or water-electrolyte imbalance, is an abnormal concentration of electrolytes in the body. Electrolytes play a vital role in maintaining homeostasis in the body and serve in many biological processes. Anions are a well known form of electrolytes and include things like calcium, magnesium, potassium, though electrolytes can form differently charged types of ions in solution (or when melted). Cations (or positively charged ions), i.e., sodium ions, are a well-known form of electrolytes. A combination of sodium (Na) with a chloride anion. Other forms of anions are for example chloride phosphate ions) and are anions (negatively− charged). Electrolytes cross barriers in (cellular membranes) in the body, such as in muscles and nerves, in the intestine, and filtered (to be controlled) by the kidney (as well as the intestine filtering minerals, for example magnesium).

Electrolytes help to regulate heart and neurological function, fluid balance, oxygen delivery, acid–base balance for example. Electrolyte imbalances can develop by consuming too little or too much electrolyte as well as excreting too little or too much electrolyte. Examples of electrolytes include calcium, chloride, magnesium, phosphate, sodium, and potassium. Electrolytes levels in the blood (used to calculate the anion gap) are Chloride (as Cl-) + bicarbonate (HCO3-, used as a buffer to control the amount of Co2 in the blood) - Sodium (Na+) + Potassium (K+).

If electrolyte concentrations are abnormal in the body (such as by overloading it with electrolytes, or the body being unable to maintain homeostasis), signs and symptoms can arise, such as those related to disease, disorders or syndromes. Electrolyte disturbances are involved in many disease processes and are an important part of patient management in medicine. The causes, severity, treatment, and outcomes of these disturbances can differ greatly depending on the implicated electrolyte. The most serious electrolyte disturbances involve abnormalities in the levels of sodium, potassium or calcium. Other electrolyte imbalances are less common and often occur in conjunction with major electrolyte changes. The kidney is the most important organ in maintaining appropriate fluid and electrolyte balance, but other factors such as hormonal changes and physiological stress play a role.

== Causes ==
Chronic laxative abuse or severe diarrhea or vomiting can lead to dehydration and electrolyte imbalance.

=== Malnutrition ===
People with malnutrition are at especially high risk for an electrolyte imbalance. Severe electrolyte imbalances must be treated carefully as there are risks with overcorrecting too quickly, which can result in arrhythmias, brain herniation, or refeeding syndrome depending on the cause of imbalance. Restrictive eating disorders such as anorexia nervosa and atypical anorexia nervosa are also associated with electrolyte imbalance.

== General function of electrolytes ==
Electrolytes are important because they are what cells (especially nerve, heart, and muscle cells) use to maintain voltages across their cell membranes. Electrolytes have different functions, and an important one is to carry electrical impulses between cells. Kidneys work to keep the electrolyte concentrations in blood constant despite changes in the body. For example, during heavy exercise, electrolytes are lost in sweat, particularly in the form of sodium and potassium. The kidneys can also generate dilute urine to balance sodium levels. These electrolytes must be replaced to keep the electrolyte concentrations of the body fluids constant. Hyponatremia, or low sodium, is the most commonly seen type of electrolyte imbalance.

Treatment of electrolyte imbalance depends on the specific electrolyte involved and whether the levels are too high or too low. The level of aggressiveness of treatment and choice of treatment may change depending on the severity of the disturbance. If the levels of an electrolyte are too low, a common response to electrolyte imbalance may be to prescribe supplementation. However, if the electrolyte involved is sodium, the issue is often water excess rather than sodium deficiency. Supplementation for these people may correct the electrolyte imbalance but at the expense of volume overload. For newborn children, this has serious risks.

=== Electrolytes and their imbalances ===
==== Calcium ====
Though calcium is the most plentiful electrolyte in the body, a large percentage of it is used to form the bones. It is mainly absorbed and excreted through the GI system. The majority of calcium resides extracellularly, and it is crucial for the function of neurons, muscle cells, function of enzymes, and coagulation. The normal range for calcium concentration in the body is 8.5 - 10.5 mg/dL. The parathyroid gland is responsible for sensing changes in calcium concentration and regulating the electrolyte with parathyroid hormone.

===== Hypercalcemia =====
Hypercalcemia describes when the concentration of calcium in the blood is too high. This occurs above 10.5 mg/dL.

====== Causes ======
The most common causes of hypercalcemia are certain types of cancer, hyperparathyroidism, hyperthyroidism, pheochromocytoma, excessive ingestion of vitamin D, sarcoidosis, and tuberculosis. Hyperparathyroidism and malignancy are the predominant causes. It can also be caused by muscle cell breakdown, prolonged immobilization, or dehydration.

====== Symptoms ======
The predominant symptoms of hypercalcemia are abdominal pain, constipation, extreme thirst, excessive urination, kidney stones, nausea, and vomiting. In severe cases where the calcium concentration is >14 mg/dL, individuals may experience confusion, altered mental status, coma, and seizure.

====== Treatment ======
Primary treatment of hypercalcemia consists of administering IV fluids. If the hypercalcemia is severe and/or associated with cancer, it may be treated with bisphosphonates. For very severe cases, hemodialysis may be considered for rapid removal of calcium from the blood.

===== Hypocalcemia =====
Hypocalcemia describes when calcium levels are too low in the blood, usually less than 8.5 mg/dL.

====== Causes ======
Hypoparathyroidism and vitamin D deficiency are common causes of hypocalcemia. It can also be caused by malnutrition, blood transfusion, ethylene glycol intoxication, and pancreatitis.

====== Symptoms ======
Neurological and cardiovascular symptoms are the most common manifestations of hypocalcemia. Patients may experience muscle cramping or twitching, and numbness around the mouth and fingers. They may also have shortness of breath, low blood pressure, and cardiac arrhythmias.

====== Treatment ======
Patients with hypocalcemia may be treated with either oral or IV calcium. Typically, IV calcium is reserved for patients with severe hypocalcemia. It is also important to check magnesium levels in patients with hypocalcemia and to replace magnesium if it is low.

==== Chloride ====
Chloride, after sodium, is the second most abundant electrolyte in the blood and most abundant in the extracellular fluid. Most of the chloride in the body is from salt (NaCl) in the diet. Chloride is part of gastric acid (HCl), which plays a role in absorption of electrolytes, activating enzymes, and killing bacteria. The levels of chloride in the blood can help determine if there are underlying metabolic disorders. Generally, chloride has an inverse relationship with bicarbonate, an electrolyte that indicates acid-base status. Overall, treatment of chloride imbalances involves addressing the underlying cause rather than supplementing or avoiding chloride.

===== Causes =====
Hyperchloremia, or high chloride levels, is usually associated with excess chloride intake (e.g., saltwater drowning), fluid loss (e.g., diarrhea, sweating), and metabolic acidosis.

===== Symptoms =====
Patients are usually asymptomatic with mild hyperchloremia. Symptoms associated with hyperchloremia are usually caused by the underlying cause of this electrolyte imbalance.

===== Treatment =====
Treat the underlying cause, which commonly includes increasing fluid intake.

==== Hypochloremia ====
===== Causes =====
Hypochloremia, or low chloride levels, are commonly associated with gastrointestinal (e.g., vomiting) and kidney (e.g., diuretics) losses. Greater water or sodium intake relative to chloride can also contribute to hypochloremia.

===== Symptoms =====
Patients are usually asymptomatic with mild hypochloremia. Symptoms associated with hypochloremia are usually caused by the underlying cause of this electrolyte imbalance.

===== Treatment =====
Treat the underlying cause, which commonly includes increasing fluid intake.

==== Magnesium ====
Magnesium is mostly found in the bones and within cells. Approximately 1% of total magnesium in the body is found in the blood. Magnesium is important in the control of metabolism and is involved in numerous enzyme reactions. A normal range is 0.70 - 1.10 mmol/L. The kidney is responsible for maintaining the magnesium levels in this narrow range.

===== Hypermagnesemia =====
Hypermagnesemia, or abnormally high levels of magnesium in the blood, is relatively rare in individuals with normal kidney function. This is defined by a magnesium concentration >2.5 mg/dL.

====== Causes ======
Hypermagnesemia typically occurs in individuals with abnormal kidney function. This imbalance can also occur with use of antacids or laxatives that contain magnesium. Iatrogenic cases of hypermagnesemia can be prevented by avoiding magnesium-containing medications.

====== Symptoms ======
Mild symptoms include nausea, flushing, and tiredness. Neurologic symptoms are seen most commonly, including decreased deep tendon reflexes. Severe symptoms include paralysis, respiratory failure, and bradycardia progressing to cardiac arrest.

====== Treatment ======
If kidney function is normal, stopping the source of magnesium intake is sufficient. Diuretics can help increase magnesium excretion in the urine. Severe symptoms may be treated with dialysis to directly remove magnesium from the blood.

===== Hypomagnesemia =====
Hypomagnesemia, or low magnesium levels in the blood, can occur in up to 12% of hospitalized patients. Symptoms or effects of hypomagnesemia can occur after relatively small deficits.

====== Causes ======
Major causes of hypomagnesemia are from gastrointestinal losses such as vomiting and diarrhea. Another major cause is from kidney losses from diuretics, alcohol use, hypercalcemia, and genetic disorders. Low dietary intake can also contribute to magnesium deficiency.

====== Symptoms ======
Hypomagnesemia is typically associated with other electrolyte abnormalities, such as hypokalemia and hypocalcemia. For this reason, there may be overlap in symptoms seen in these other electrolyte deficiencies. Severe symptoms include arrhythmias, seizures, and tetany.

====== Treatment ======
The first step in treatment is determining whether the deficiency is caused by a gastrointestinal or kidney problem. People with no or minimal symptoms are given oral magnesium; however, many people experience diarrhea and other gastrointestinal discomfort. Those who cannot tolerate or receive magnesium or those with severe symptoms can receive intravenous magnesium.

Hypomagnesemia may prevent the normalization of other electrolyte deficiencies. If other electrolyte deficiencies are associated, normalizing magnesium levels may be necessary to treat the other deficiencies.

==== Potassium ====
Potassium resides mainly inside the cells of the body, so its concentration in the blood can range anywhere from 3.5 mEq/L to 5 mEq/L. The kidneys are responsible for excreting the majority of potassium from the body. This means their function is crucial for maintaining a proper balance of potassium in the blood stream.

===== Hyperkalemia =====
Hyperkalemia means the concentration of potassium in the blood is too high. This occurs when the concentration of potassium is >5 mEq/L. It can lead to cardiac arrhythmias and even death. As such, it is considered to be the most dangerous electrolyte disturbance.

====== Causes ======
Hyperkalemia is typically caused by decreased excretion by the kidneys, shift of potassium to the extracellular space, or increased consumption of potassium rich foods in patients with kidney failure. The most common cause of hyperkalemia is lab error due to potassium released as blood cells from the sample break down. Other common causes are kidney disease, cell death, acidosis, and drugs that affect kidney function.

====== Symptoms ======
Part of the danger of hyperkalemia is that it is often asymptomatic, and only detected during normal lab work done by primary care physicians. As potassium levels get higher, individuals may begin to experience nausea, vomiting, and diarrhea. Patients with severe hyperkalemia, defined by levels above 7 mEq/L, may experience muscle cramps, numbness, tingling, absence of reflexes, and paralysis. Patients may experience arrhythmias that can result in death.

====== Treatment ======
There are three mainstays of treatment of hyperkalemia. These are stabilization of cardiac cells, shift of potassium into the cells, and removal of potassium from the body. Stabilization of cardiac muscle cells is done by administering calcium intravenously. Shift of potassium into the cells is done using both, insulin and albuterol inhalers. Excretion of potassium from the body is done using either hemodialysis, loop diuretics, or a resin that causes potassium to be excreted in the fecal matter.

===== Hypokalemia =====
The most common electrolyte disturbance, hypokalemia means that the concentration of potassium is <3.5 mEq/L. It often occurs concurrently with low magnesium levels.

====== Causes ======
Low potassium is caused by increased excretion of potassium, decreased consumption of potassium rich foods, movement of potassium into the cells, or certain endocrine diseases. Excretion is the most common cause of hypokalemia and can be caused by diuretic use, metabolic acidosis, diabetic ketoacidosis, hyperaldosteronism, and renal tubular acidosis. Potassium can also be lost through vomiting and diarrhea.

====== Symptoms ======
Hypokalemia is often asymptomatic, and symptoms may not appear until potassium concentration is <2.5 mEq/L. Typical symptoms consist of muscle weakness and cramping. Low potassium can also cause cardiac arrhythmias.

====== Treatment ======
Hypokalemia is treated by replacing the body's potassium. This can occur either orally or intravenously. Because low potassium is usually accompanied by low magnesium, patients are often given magnesium alongside potassium.

==== Sodium ====
Sodium is the most abundant electrolyte in the blood. It is a common saying in human physiology that "cells are bags of Potassium floating in a sea of Sodium." Sodium and its homeostasis in the human body is highly dependent on fluids. The human body is approximately 60% water, a percentage which is also known as total body water. The total body water can be divided into two compartments called extracellular fluid (ECF) and intracellular fluid (ICF). The majority of the sodium in the body stays in the extracellular fluid compartment. This compartment consists of the fluid surrounding the cells and the fluid inside the blood vessels. ECF has a sodium concentration of approximately 140 mEq/L. Because cell membranes are permeable to water but not sodium, the movement of water across membranes affects the concentration of sodium in the blood. Sodium acts as a force that pulls water across membranes, and water moves from places with lower sodium concentration to places with higher sodium concentration. This happens through a process called osmosis. When evaluating sodium imbalances, both total body water and total body sodium must be considered.

===== Hypernatremia =====
Hypernatremia means that the concentration of sodium in the blood is too high. An individual is considered to be having high sodium at levels above 145 mEq/L of sodium. Hypernatremia is not common in individuals with no other health concerns. Most individuals with this disorder have either experienced loss of water from diarrhea, altered sense of thirst, inability to consume water, inability of kidneys to make concentrated urine, or increased salt intake.

====== Causes ======
There are three types of hypernatremia each with different causes. The first is dehydration along with low total body sodium. This is most commonly caused by heatstroke, burns, extreme sweating, vomiting, and diarrhea. The second is low total body water with normal body sodium. This can be caused by diabetes insipidus, renal disease, hypothalamic dysfunction, sickle cell disease, and certain drugs. The third is increased total body sodium which is caused by increased ingestion, Conn's syndrome, or Cushing's syndrome.

====== Symptoms ======
Symptoms of hypernatremia may vary depending on type and how quickly the electrolyte disturbance developed. Common symptoms are dehydration, nausea, vomiting, fatigue, weakness, increased thirst, and excess urination. Patients may be on medications that caused the imbalance such as diuretics or nonsteroidal anti-inflammatory drugs. Some patients may have no obvious symptoms at all.

====== Treatment ======
It is crucial to first assess the stability of the patient. If there are any signs of shock such as tachycardia or hypotension, these must be treated immediately with IV saline infusion. Once the patient is stable, it is important to identify the underlying cause of hypernatremia as that may affect the treatment plan. The final step in treatment is to calculate the patient's free water deficit and to replace it at a steady rate using a combination of oral or IV fluids. The rate of replacement of fluids varies depending on how long the patient has been hypernatremic. Lowering the sodium level too quickly can cause cerebral edema.

===== Hyponatremia =====
Hyponatremia means that the concentration of sodium in the blood is too low. It is generally defined as a concentration lower than 135 mEq/L. This relatively common electrolyte disorder can indicate the presence of a disease process, but in the hospital setting is more often due to administration of Hypotonic fluids. The majority of hospitalized patients only experience mild hyponatremia, with levels above 130 mEq/L. Only 1-4% of patients experience levels lower than 130 mEq/L.

====== Causes ======
Hyponatremia has many causes including heart failure, chronic kidney disease, liver disease, treatment with thiazide diuretics, psychogenic polydipsia, and syndrome of inappropriate antidiuretic hormone secretion. It can also be found in the postoperative state and in the setting of accidental water intoxication as can be seen with intense exercise. Common causes in pediatric patients may be diarrheal illness, frequent feedings with dilute formula, water intoxication via excessive consumption, and enemas. Pseudohyponatremia is a false low sodium reading that can be caused by high levels of fats or proteins in the blood. Dilutional hyponatremia can happen in diabetics as high glucose levels pull water into the blood stream causing the sodium concentration to be lower. Diagnosis of the cause of hyponatremia relies on three factors: volume status, plasma osmolality, urine sodium levels, and urine osmolality.

====== Symptoms ======
Many individuals with mild hyponatremia will not experience symptoms. Severity of symptoms is directly correlated with severity of hyponatremia and rapidness of onset. General symptoms include loss of appetite, nausea, vomiting, confusion, agitation, and weakness. More concerning symptoms involve the central nervous system and include seizures, coma, and death due to brain herniation. These usually do not occur until sodium levels fall below 120 mEq/L.

====== Treatment ======
Considerations for treatment include symptom severity, time to onset, volume status, underlying cause, and sodium levels. If the sodium level is <120 mEq/L, the person can be treated with hypertonic saline as extremely low levels are associated with severe neurological symptoms. In non-emergency situations, it is important to correct the sodium slowly to minimize risk of osmotic demyelination syndrome. If a person has low total body water and low sodium they are typically given fluids. If a person has high total body water (such as due to heart failure or kidney disease) they may be placed on fluid restriction, salt restriction, and treated with a diuretic. If a person has a normal volume of total body water, they may be placed on fluid restriction alone.

== See also ==
- Acidosis (low pH) and alkalosis (high pH)
- Dehydration
- Malnutrition
- Starvation
- Sports drink
