= Tea and toast syndrome =

Form of malnutrition

Tea and toast syndrome is a form of malnutrition commonly experienced by elderly people who cannot prepare meals and tend to themselves. The term is not intrinsic to tea or bread products only; rather, it describes limited dietary patterns that lead to reduced calories resulting in a deficiency of vitamins and other nutrients. This can contribute to a gradual loss of wellness and muscle due to poor protein intake. In elderly individuals with a low GFR, the syndrome may manifest itself as hyponatremia, a low concentration of the electrolyte sodium in the bloodstream. This is attributed to drinking a large amount of water while consuming a diet poor in salt and protein. Hyponatremia can lead to various neurological problems ranging from headaches and a decreased ability to think, to seizures and coma in the most severe cases.

== Signs and symptoms ==
Some signs and symptoms of malnutrition in older adults may include unintended weight loss, tiredness and fatigue, muscle weakness or loss of strength, constipation, dizziness, syncope, gastritis, peptic ulcers, paleness of the skin, poor wound healing, depression, problems with memory, a weak immune system, and anemia.

== Causes ==
The syndrome often occurs once children have moved away, and a partner has died or is dying. An elderly person with nobody left to cook for, or without the skills to cook, will revert to a diet of simple foods such as bread, cheese and crackers, and canned foods. While the sodium content is variable in such foods, they are among the top contributors of sodium in the average American's diet. However, if portion sizes are inadequate, a person may not be consuming enough protein and salt. When combined with excessive water intake, this results in insufficient solute concentration. Patients with poor kidney function, or low glomerular filtration rate, are at even higher risk of hyponatremia due to increased water retention. According to the New York Times, as many as 60% of seniors living at home are either malnourished or at risk of becoming malnourished. In addition to the problems that a lack of nutrients will cause, this state also means that the complications of other illnesses, even the common cold, can be much more severe.

Factors that lead to the syndrome include poverty, social isolation, psychological issues such as depression, loss of taste and smell, chronic illnesses that cause a lack of appetite, dental problems that result in difficulty chewing and swallowing foods, a decline in cognitive functioning, alcoholism, and physical disabilities and limitations. Though less of a factor than psychological issues, the increased number of medications often taken by elderly people can also affect eating habits. These medications may suppress appetite, make food taste different, or affect how nutrients are absorbed, making it even less likely seniors will get the required nutrients. 8% of seniors suffer from hyponatremia, although it is unclear how much of that is due to "tea and toast" diets. The prevalence of hyponatremia in the elderly population may be even higher in health care settings. Hyponatremia is believed to arise as a result of a diet poor in salt and protein with large water intake in combination with a low glomerular filtration rate (GFR). The low GFR causes a lowered rate of osmole excretion, and an increase in the amount of water reabsorbed; thus, hyponatremia occurs when the amount of water intake exceeds the renal water excretion capacity. Medications, such as thiazides and antidepressants, may exacerbate symptoms of hyponatremia.

== Diagnosis ==
Potential signs and symptoms of "tea and toast syndrome" can include those of malnutrition such as general weakness and cognitive impairment. In general, hyponatremia is usually asymptomatic until severe.

Typical laboratory findings for tea and toast syndrome include a low serum osmolality (hypotonicity) with normal urine osmolality since antidiuretic hormone levels are normal. A common laboratory finding for the tea and toast phenomenon is manifestation as hyponatremia. This laboratory finding is not commonly symptomatic when paired with other abnormal electrolyte findings seen in the elderly such as hyperglycemia. Other laboratory tests to identify the cause of hyponatremia as being due to low solute intake include identifying a patient's protein intake through measures of urine urea content and a history of their regular dietary intake. Upon determination of the cause of hyponatremia as being due to low dietary intake, effective treatment measures can be taken on an individual patient basis.

== Prevention ==
Cara Myer, the author of "The Tea and Toast Syndrome: Psychosocial Aspects of Congregate Dining" suggests that congregate dining for older adults may be an excellent strategy to prevent tea and toast syndrome. Myer mentions that social service interventions for malnutrition, including congregate dining, are often under-utilized and could provide a stimulating environment that may improve the quality of life of many older adults.

Further, general preventative measures focus on evaluating the nutrition of older adults, including keeping a record of weight patterns, helping with meal plans focusing on nutrient-rich foods, and using local services such as a meal delivery program.

Additional strategies include:

- Taking an inventory of someone's refrigerator or pantry to determine the types and amounts of food they have
- For dental and chewing challenges, juicing or mincing fresh produce, or using canned or frozen fruits and vegetables
- Using nutritional supplements like a multivitamin pill (with primary care provider's approval)
- Clarifying with a healthcare provider if a given medication can cause loss of appetite
- Encouraging exercise to improve appetite and maintain bone and muscular health

== Treatment ==
Treatment of tea and toast syndrome is centered primarily around resolving hyponatremia. Treatment choice depends on the type of hyponatremia.

Traditional treatment for hyponatremia depends on the volume load in the person. For those who are euvolemic (normal body volume load), fluid intake should be restricted. In those that are hypovolemic (low body volume load), give isotonic saline. In those that are hypervolemic (high body volume load), diuresis should be induced. Elderly patients may present in any of these volume states. However, "tea and toast" syndrome patients typically present euvolemic hyponatremia since their hyponatremia is caused by low solute intake. These patients must receive proper nutrition that is higher in protein and electrolyte intake.

The Health and Medicine Division of the National Academies of Science, Engineering, and Medicine recommends that older adults improve their diet by consuming more fish, low-fat dairy products, and whole grains (such as fortified breakfast cereals). Older adults can also improve their diet by snacking on nuts and legumes as well as ensuring that they include fruit and vegetables at the center of their diet.

== See also ==
- Beer potomania
- Food choice of older adults
