= Potomania =

Low-sodium state from excess beer intake

- Other names: Beer potomania, Beer drinker's potomania, Beer drinker's hyponatremia, Frat boy syndrome
- Annual beer consumption per capita.
- Symptoms: hyponatremia
- Risk factors: alcoholism

Potomania (From Greek pōtō "drink (liquor)" + mania) is a specific hypo-osmolality syndrome related to massive consumption of fluids that are poor in solutes and electrolytes. Beer potomania is a subtype of potomania characterized by chronic ingestion of large volumes of beer with a diet low in protein and electrolytes. Since beer contains little electrolytes or protein, it provides insufficient solute to facilitate water excretion by the kidney, diluting the blood and leading to severe hyponatremia. The symptoms of beer potomania are similar to other causes of hyponatremia, including dizziness, muscular weakness, neurological impairment and seizures. While the symptoms of beer potomania are similar to other causes of hyponatremia and acute water intoxication, it should be considered an independent clinical entity because of its often chronic nature of onset, pathophysiology, and presentation of symptoms.

== Pathophysiology ==
The normal human kidney, through suppression of anti-diuretic hormone, is able to excrete vast amounts of dilute urine. However, maximum hourly rates rarely exceed 800 to 1,000 mL/hr. The intake of solutes is necessary to excrete free water. Without proper solute intake, the amount of free water excretion possible becomes severely limited.

To excrete water the kidney must also excrete solute. Solute presented to the kidney is derived from the diet in the form of electrolytes such as sodium, chloride and potassium. The other main solute is blood urea nitrogen which is created from protein metabolism. The kidney is able to excrete urine with a broad range of osmolalities - roughly 40 to 1200mOsmol/kg. It cannot excrete urine that is more dilute than 40mOsmol/kg.

If a person has a very poor dietary intake of electrolytes and eats very little protein - as may be the case with chronic beer consumption - then the renal solute load may fall below a level that is sufficient to clear the volume of water ingested. Although beer has a relatively high osmolality due to the ethanol concentration (standard beer osmolality is roughly 1000mOsmol/kg) it provides little renal solute contribution and is low in sodium. If the dietary/renal solute load is less than the volume of water ingested then the excess free water will be retained leading to dilutional hyponatremia. For example, if the renal solute load is 200 the maximum water able to be excreted per 24 hours is 5L. If the person drinks 6L of beer then 1L per day will be retained as free water.

Any vomiting or gastrointestinal tract absorptive problems due to alcohol intoxication can also compound the effect of potomania due to additional electrolyte and acid-base disturbances.

== Diagnosis ==
The diagnosis of potomania requires both clinical and biochemical criteria.

Hypotonic hyponatremia

Dilute urine (< 100mOsmol/kg) although this finding is variable in the few cases described in the medical literature

Clinical evidence of excessive beer (or equivalent alcoholic drinks such as cider) consumption often accompanied by evidence of poor dietary intake.

No alternative diagnosis that is considered more likely.

== Treatment ==
Patient with severe hyponatremia are at risk of cerebral edema, coma and seizures. International guidelines recommend the use of hypertonic saline to treat profound hyponatremia with severe neurological symptoms. For less severe symptoms restoring a normal diet and restricting alcohol intake reverses the abnormality as there is no underlying physical disease.

The rise in serum sodium due to redistribution alone can be estimated from the following equation.

$\text{Na}_{\text{final}} = \frac{(\text{Na}_{\text{serum}} \times \text{ECF}) + (\text{Na}_{\text{infusate}} \times V_{\text{infusate}})}{\text{ECF} + V_{\text{infusate}}}$

Where Na_{serum} is the concentration of the patient's plasma sodium, ECF is an estimate of extracellular water in litres (approximately body weight in kg x 0.2 for males and body weight x 0.17 for females), Na_{infusate} is the sodium concentration of the IV fluid and V_{infusate} is the volume of the IV fluid in litres. For a 100 kg man with a plasma Na of 105 mmol/L given 300mLs of 2.7% saline (462 mmol of Na) the final dilution of plasma sodium would only be 110 mmol/L.

$\frac{(105 \times 20) + (462 \times 0.3)}{20 + 0.3} = 110.3$

This initial 5 mmol/L rise is usually sufficient to stabilise the patient's acute neurological deterioration due to cerebral oedema. Note that it is a rise in osmolality that is the treatment aim rather than Na itself - however for simplicity the Na is used as a measure of the osmolality and the osmolar rise will be roughly twice the Na rise. Direct measurement of osmolality would be preferable but the turnaround time in most hospital laboratories is too long to be useful so serum Na is used and therapeutic targets are set against this.

Patients with potomania are a particularly high risk subgroup for the development of osmotic demyelination syndrome (ODS). This is not because of the immediate rise in osmolality due to the hypertonic saline from the redistribution calculated above. Rather the treatment can induce a water diuresis as a secondary phenomena.

However, after the initial rise from this mixing of 300mLs of 2.7% saline with the patients blood there is an osmotic load (Na^{+} + Cl^{-}) of 277mOsmol/kg available to the kidneys. With this load the patient could then potentially produce a water diuresis of up to 7L (277 / 40). This secondary water diuresis (sometimes termed aquaresis) usually happens in the subsequent 24 hours. It is this secondary water diuresis that can cause a very rapid rise in serum osmolality, sometimes greater than 2 mmol/L/hr which can lead to ODS. Physicians treating patients at high risk of ODS should both measure plasma Na every 3–4 hours and also the urine output for at least 24 hours. If a brisk diuresis does occur (>2mL urine per kg body weight per hour) prophylactic desmopressin (4 mg 8 hourly IV) can be given to limit free water clearance. If the patient does overshoot the recommended rise (10 mmol/l in 24 hours and 18 mmol/l in 48 hours) bolus 5% dextrose in water can be given to bring the Na level back down to target levels.

== See also ==
- Hyponatremia
- Primary polydipsia
- Water intoxication
- Tea and toast syndrome
- Alcohol (drug)
- Holiday heart syndrome
