= Electrolyte exclusion effect =

Aspect of anatomy

The electrolyte exclusion effect is the exclusion of electrolytes from the fraction of the total blood plasma volume that is occupied by solids. This phenomenon plays an important role in pseudohyponatremia, an error affecting measurements made by either flame photometry or indirect potentiometry but not by direct potentiometry.

The volume of total solids (primarily protein and lipid) in a plasma sample is approximately 7%, so that only 93% is water. The main electrolytes are confined to water phase. So for example in 10 μL plasma sample, only 9.3 μL is water that contains the electrolyte. Thus if the concentration of an electrolyte, say Na^{+} is determined to be 140 mmol/L, it is the concentration in total plasma volume, not in plasma water volume.

This phenomenon produces only a slight difference as volume fraction of water in plasma is sufficiently constant. But, in patients with severe endogenous or exogenous hypertriglyceridemia and in patients with high plasma protein concentration (usually due to paraproteinemia), water portion of plasma is replaced with either lipid or protein causing falsely low electrolyte value (pseudohyponatremia). Conversely, in patients with low plasma protein concentration (a finding often seen in critical care), the water content of plasma is higher than normal, resulting in the reciprocal artifact, a falsely high electrolyte value (pseudohypernatremia).
