= William Schwartz (physician) =

William Benjamin Schwartz (May 16, 1922 – March 15, 2009) was a pioneering nephrologist who identified rising costs of health care as an incipient problem as early as the 1980s.

Schwartz attended Duke University after serving in the Army in World War II, earning undergraduate and medical degrees. His pioneering observation that the antibiotic sulfanilamide increased excretion of sodium in patients with heart failure led to the discovery and development of modern diuretic drugs. The Lancet.

Early in his career, he joined what is now Tufts Medical Center, and founded its Division of Nephrology in 1950. He served as its head until 1971, following which he became the Chairman of Medicine and chief physician at Tufts, positions he held until 1976. Then, he left his administrative position at the medical center, becoming the Vannevar Bush University Professor at Tufts University School of Medicine and Professor of Medicine until joining the faculty of the University of Southern California Medical School in 1992.

Beginning in the 1970s, Schwartz developed an interest in medical decision-making, and was an early researcher into artificial intelligence applications to medicine. Later in his career, he focused on the US medical system more broadly, and investigated issues such as costs, possible rationing of health care, availability of specialist care, and malpractice insurance. With economist Henry Aaron, he co-authored The Painful Prescription: Rationing Hospital Care in 1984. Further advancements in medicine—such as widespread availability of transplant surgery, Cardiac surgery, and MRIs strengthened his views of the need to contain spiraling costs through some form of rationing.

The syndrome Schwartz-Bartter's syndrome is named after him, along with Frederic Bartter.
