= Hyperproteinemia =

High protein concentration in the blood

- Other names: High blood protein
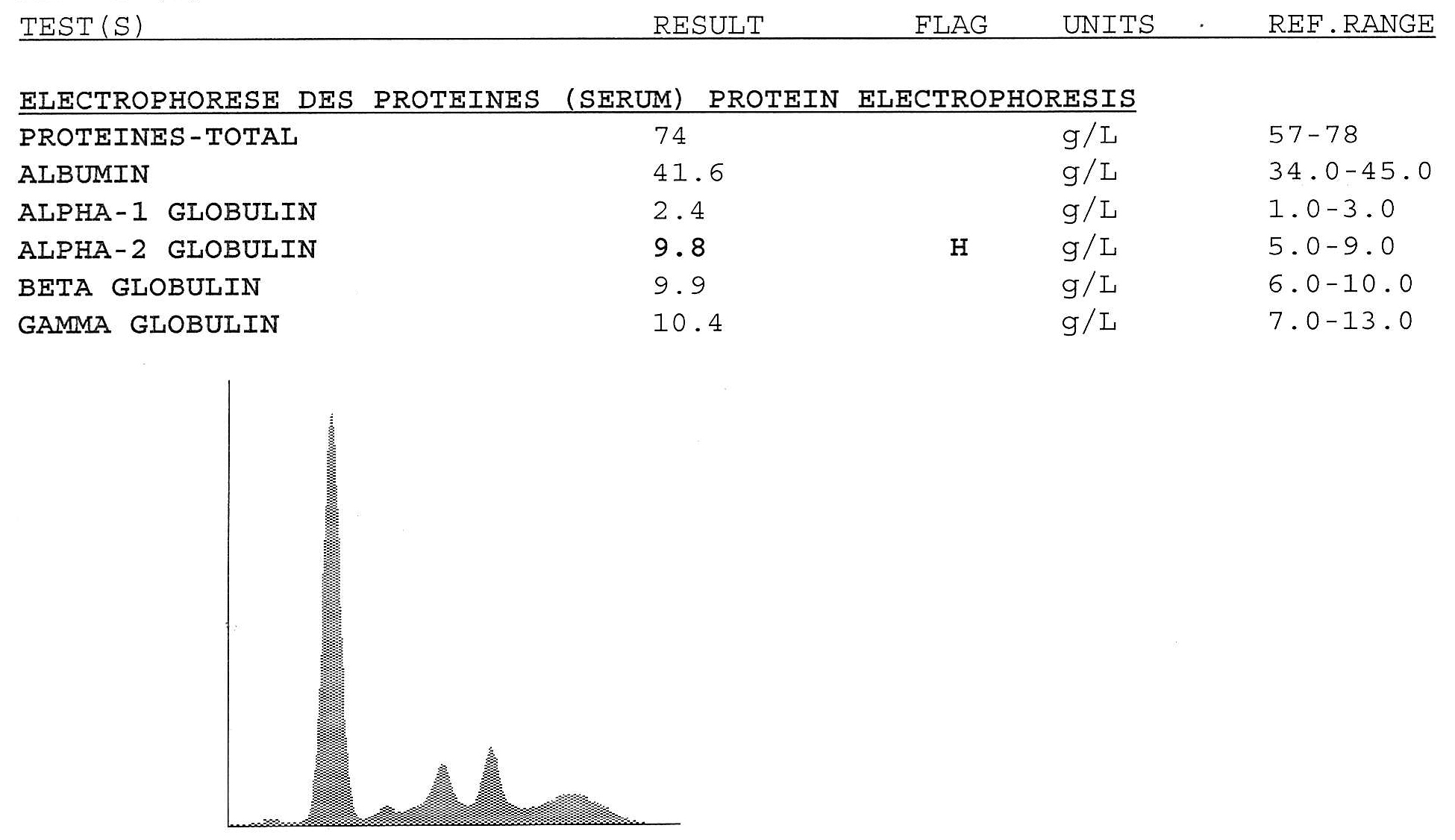
- Serum protein electrophoresis normal results (study performed at a hospital laboratory).
- Specialty: Hematology

Hyperproteinemia is the state of having overly high levels of protein in the blood. This can occur due to monoclonal gammopathies such as multiple myeloma and after intravenous immunoglobulin has been given. It can result in a falsely low appearing sodium level (hyponatremia).

== Causes ==
Increases in certain proteins that are typically present in relatively low concentrations, such as acute phase reactants and polyclonal immunoglobulins caused by inflammation, late-stage liver disease, and infections, can result in mild hyperproteinemia. Normal total protein levels are not sufficient to rule out multiple myeloma or other malignant paraproteinemias, but they may also be the cause of moderate-to-marked hyperproteinemia. To determine the reason behind the elevated serum total protein, a serum protein electrophoresis should be carried out.

The plasma protein level may increase due to dehydration from blood loss of fluids (severe vomiting and diarrhea).

1. Physiological causes:

- Standing position
- Vigorous exercise
- Excessive stasis while withdrawing blood

2. Pathological causes:

- Infective disease like tuberculosis
- Multiple myeloma

Reduced production (hypogammaglobulinemia), as well as increased protein loss (nephrotic syndrome, protein-losing enteropathy), can cause hypoproteinemia. To determine the reason behind the lower serum total protein, a serum protein electrophoresis ought to be carried out. Urine protein electrophoresis needs to be carried out if a nephrotic pattern is found.

== See also ==
- Hypoproteinemia
- Plasma protein
