= Effective circulating volume =

Volume of arterial blood effectively perfusing tissue

In hematology, effective circulating volume (ECV) is the volume of arterial blood effectively perfusing tissue. ECV is a dynamic quantity and not a measurable, distinct compartment. This concept is useful for discussion of cardiovascular and renal physiology.

Though ECV normally varies with extracellular fluid (ECF), they become uncoupled in diseases, such as congestive heart failure (CHF) or hepatic cirrhosis. In such cases, decreased ECV may lead to volume depletion responses and edema.

Decreased ECV can stimulate renin secretion or stimulate a sympathetic nervous system response or prostaglandin release (all of which help mediate renal blood flow and glomerular filtration rate among other things).

== See also ==
- Blood plasma

== Sources ==
- John Bullock, Michael B. Wang, Joseph Boyle. NMS Physiology. 4th ed., Lippincott Williams & Wilkins, 2001. pp 337-339.
