= Frederic Bartter =

American endocrinologist

Frederic Crosby Bartter
- Born: September 10, 1914; Manila, Philippines
- Died: May 5, 1983 (aged 68)
- Occupation: endocrinologist
- Spouse: Jane Lillard

Frederic Crosby Bartter (September 10, 1914 – May 5, 1983) was an American endocrinologist best known for his work on hormones affecting the kidney and his discovery of syndrome of inappropriate antidiuretic hormone (SIADH) and Bartter syndrome. He had a separate interest in mushroom poisoning.

== Early life ==
He was born to an English Anglican minister and his American wife in Manila, Philippines, and grew up in the mountain village of Baguio. At the age of 13 he was sent, together with his brother, to attend the Lenox School until 1930. After teaching in the Philippines for a year, he enrolled at Harvard where he obtained a BA in 1935. After a year at the Harvard School of Public Health, he entered Harvard Medical School, graduating in 1940. He interned at Roosevelt Hospital in New York City in 1941 and 1942. His army service led to academic work on blood products and onchocerciasis (river blindness, a tropical disease).

== Boston ==
He became a research fellow to Fuller Albright at Massachusetts General Hospital in 1946, and joined the clinical staff in 1950. Albright influenced Bartter significantly in several ways: research was mainly conducted on patients, who were observed very closely for long periods of time, and his interests encompassed many fields. Particular interests were calcium metabolism, the hypothalamic-pituitary-adrenal axis, blood volume and electrolyte physiology, and the actions of sex steroids. Significant observations were made in congenital adrenal hyperplasia.

== Bethesda ==
From 1951 to 1978, Bartter served as Chief of the National Institutes of Health Endocrine-Hypertension Branch. Much of his work here was on aldosterone and its effects on the cardiovascular system. He collaborated with numerous researchers, including Grant Liddle (eponymized in Liddle's syndrome). Investigations in 1957 led to the recognition of SIADH, and his work on aldosterone and the kidney handling of electrolytes led to his description, in 1963, of the syndrome that would later bear his name - Bartter syndrome.

== Texas ==
In 1978, he moved to the University of Texas Health Science Center at San Antonio. Here, he continued his work on hypertension (high blood pressure) started at Bethesda, and his own hypertension was discovered during the research.

He was elected to the National Academy of Sciences in 1979, already having received honours from the American Society for Clinical Investigation, the Endocrine Society, and numerous other bodies. He collapsed suddenly due to a cerebral hemorrhage at an NAS conference, and died soon afterwards. He was married to Jane Lillard and left three children: two sons and a daughter.

Since 1986, the American Society for Bone and Mineral Research has awarded the Frederic C. Bartter Award for outstanding clinical investigation.
