= Central pontine myelinolysis =

Type of nerve damage in the brainstem

- Other names: Osmotic demyelination syndrome, central pontine demyelination
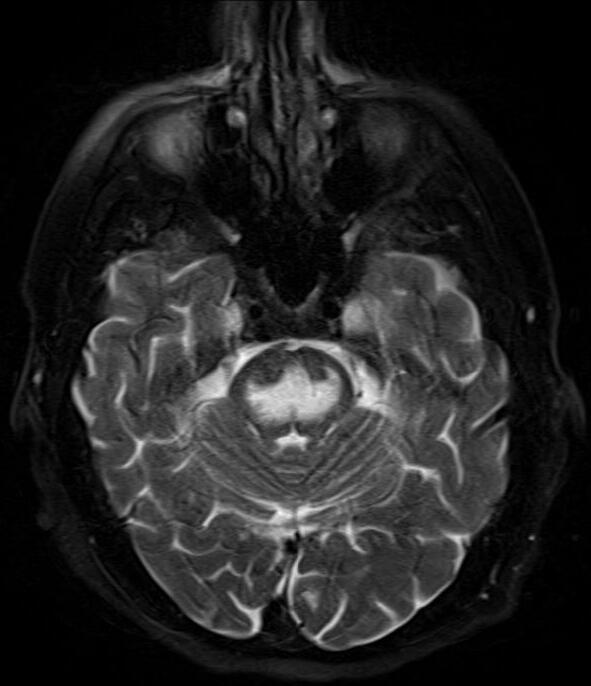
- Axial fat-saturated T2-weighted image showing hyperintensity in the pons with sparing of the peripheral fibers, the patient was an alcoholic admitted with a serum Na of 101 treated with hypertonic saline, he was left with quadriparesis, dysarthria, and altered mental status
- Specialty: Neurology
- Causes: Overly rapid correction of hyponatremia (low blood sodium)
- Risk factors: Alcohol use disorder, malnutrition, hypokalemia (low potassium), severe hyponatremia, liver disease

Central pontine myelinolysis (CPM) is a neurological condition involving severe damage to the myelin sheath of nerve cells in the pons (an area of the brainstem). It is predominantly iatrogenic (treatment-induced), and is characterized by acute paralysis, dysphagia (difficulty swallowing), dysarthria (difficulty speaking), and other neurological symptoms.

Central pontine myelinolysis was first described as a disorder in 1959. The original paper described four cases with fatal outcomes, and the findings on autopsy. The disease was described as a disease of alcoholics and malnutrition. 'Central pontine' indicated the site of the lesion, and 'myelinolysis' was used to emphasise that myelin was affected. The authors intentionally avoided the term 'demyelination' to describe the condition, to differentiate this condition from multiple sclerosis and other neuroinflammatory disorders.

Since this original description, demyelination in other areas of the central nervous system associated with osmotic stress has been described outside the pons (extrapontine). Osmotic demyelination syndrome (ODS) is the term used for both central pontine myelinolysis and extrapontine myelinolysis.

Central pontine myelinolysis and osmotic demyelination syndrome present most commonly as a complication of treatment of patients with profound hyponatremia (low sodium), which can result from a varied spectrum of conditions, based on different mechanisms. It occurs as a consequence of a rapid rise in serum tonicity following treatment in individuals with chronic, severe hyponatremia who have made intracellular adaptations to the prevailing hypotonicity.

== Signs and symptoms ==
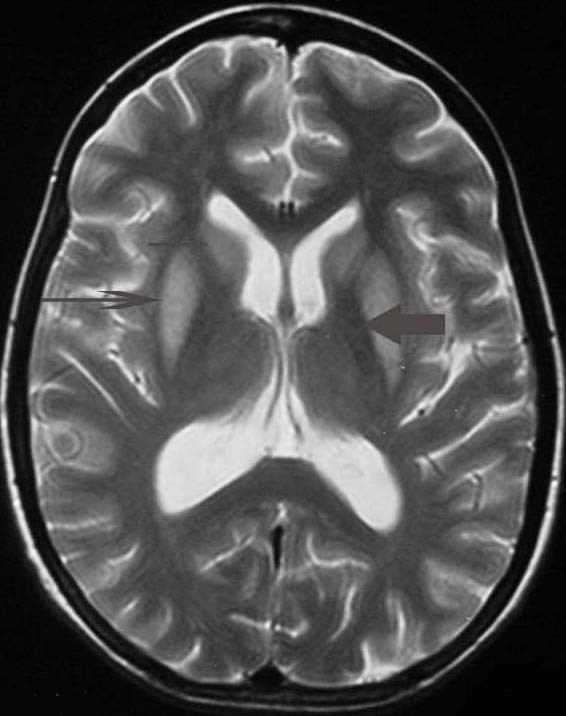
T2 weighted magnetic resonance scan image showing bilaterally symmetrical hyperintensities in caudate nucleus (small, thin arrow), putamen (long arrow), with sparing of globus pallidus (broad arrow), suggestive of extrapontine myelinolysis (osmotic demyelination syndrome)

Symptoms depend on the regions of the brain involved. Before its onset, patients may present with the neurological signs and symptoms of hyponatraemic encephalopathy such as nausea and vomiting, confusion, headache and seizures. These symptoms may resolve with normalisation of the serum sodium concentration. Three to five days later, a second phase of neurological manifestations occurs, correlating with the onset of myelinolysis. Observable immediate precursors may include seizures, disturbed consciousness, gait changes, and decrease or cessation of respiratory function.

The classical clinical presentation is the progressive development of spastic quadriparesis, pseudobulbar palsy, and emotional lability (pseudobulbar affect), with other more variable neurological features associated with brainstem damage. These result from a rapid myelinolysis of the corticobulbar and corticospinal tracts in the brainstem.

Approximately 10% of people with central pontine myelinolysis also develop extrapontine myelinolysis. In these cases, symptoms of Parkinson's disease may be generated.

== Causes ==
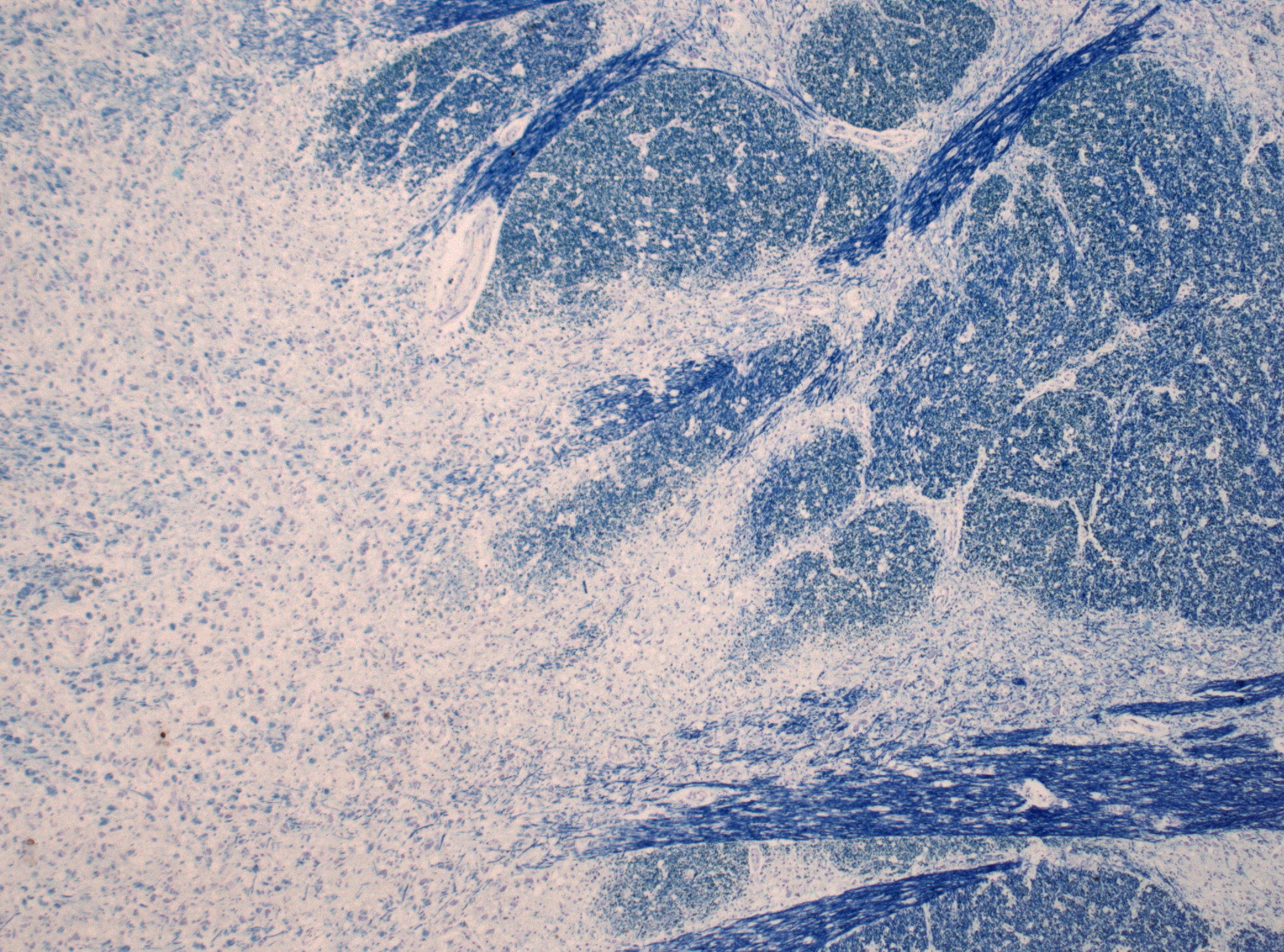
Loss of myelinated fibers at the basilar part of the pons in the brainstem (Luxol-Fast blue stain)

The most common cause is overly-rapid correction of low blood sodium levels (hyponatremia). Apart from rapid correction of hyponatraemia, there are case reports of central pontine myelinolysis in association with hypokalaemia, anorexia nervosa when feeding is started, patients undergoing dialysis and burn victims. There is a case report of central pontine myelinolysis occurring in the context of refeeding syndrome, in the absence of hyponatremia.

It has also been known to occur in patients suffering withdrawal symptoms of chronic alcoholism. In these instances, occurrence may be entirely unrelated to hyponatremia or rapid correction of hyponatremia. It could affect patients who take some prescription medicines that are able to cross the blood-brain barrier and cause abnormal thirst reception - in this scenario, the central pontine myelinolysis is caused by polydipsia leading to low blood sodium levels (hyponatremia).

In schizophrenic patients with psychogenic polydipsia, inadequate thirst reception leads to excessive water intake, severely diluting serum sodium. With this excessive thirst combined with psychotic symptoms, brain damage such as central pontine myelinolysis may result from hyperosmolarity caused by excess intake of fluids, (primary polydipsia) although this is difficult to determine because such patients are often institutionalised and have a long history of mental health conditions.

It has been observed following hematopoietic stem cell transplantation.

Central pontine myelinolysis may also occur in patients prone to hyponatremia affected by:

- Severe liver disease (e.g., cirrhosis)
- Liver transplant
- Alcoholism
- Hypokalemia
- People with serum sodium <105 mEq/L
- Severe burns
- Malnutrition
- Anorexia nervosa
- Severe electrolyte disorders
- HIV/AIDS
- hyperemesis gravidarum
- Hyponatremia due to peritoneal dialysis
- Wernicke encephalopathy

== Pathophysiology ==
The currently accepted theory states that the brain cells adjust their osmolarities by changing levels of certain osmolytes like inositol, betaine, and glutamine in response to varying serum osmolality. In the context of chronic low plasma sodium (hyponatremia), the brain compensates by decreasing the levels of these osmolytes within the cells, so that they can remain relatively isotonic with their surroundings and not absorb too much fluid. The reverse is true in hypernatremia, in which the cells increase their intracellular osmolytes so as not to lose too much fluid to the extracellular space.

With correction of the hyponatremia with intravenous fluids, the extracellular tonicity increases, followed by an increase in intracellular tonicity. When the correction is too rapid, not enough time is allowed for the brain's cells to adjust to the new tonicity, namely by increasing the intracellular osmoles mentioned earlier. If the serum sodium levels rise too rapidly, the increased extracellular tonicity will continue to drive water out of the brain's cells. This can lead to cellular dysfunction and central pontine myelinolysis.

== Diagnosis ==
It can be diagnosed clinically in the appropriate context, but may be difficult to confirm radiologically using conventional imaging techniques. Changes are more prominent on MRI than on CT, but often take days or weeks after acute symptom onset to develop. Imaging by MRI typically demonstrates areas of hyperintensity on T2-weighted images.

== Prevention and Treatment ==
To minimise the risk of this condition developing from its most common cause, overly rapid reversal of hyponatremia, the hyponatremia should be corrected at a rate not exceeding 10 mmol/L/24 h or 0.5 mEq/L/h; or 18 mEq/L/48hrs; thus potentially avoiding demyelination although ODS can still occur with rises in osmolality within recommended ranges. No large clinical trials have been performed to examine the efficacy of therapeutic re-lowering of serum sodium, or other interventions sometimes advocated, such as steroids or plasma exchange. Alcoholic patients should receive vitamin supplementation and a formal evaluation of their nutritional status.

Once osmotic demyelination has begun, there is no cure or specific treatment. Care is mainly supportive. People with alcohol use disorder are usually given vitamins to correct other deficiencies. The favourable factors contributing to the good outcome in central pontine myelinolysis without hyponatremia were: concurrent treatment of all electrolyte disturbances, early intensive care unit involvement at the advent of respiratory complications, early introduction of feeding, including thiamine supplements with close monitoring of the electrolyte changes and input.

Research has led to improved outcomes. Animal studies suggest that inositol reduces the severity of osmotic demyelination syndrome if given before attempting to correct chronic hyponatraemia. Further study is required before using inositol in humans for this purpose.

== Prognosis ==
Though traditionally the prognosis is considered poor, a good functional recovery is possible. All patients at risk of developing refeeding syndrome should have their electrolytes closely monitored, including sodium, potassium, magnesium, glucose and phosphate. Recent data indicate that the prognosis of critically ill patients may even be better than what is generally considered, despite severe initial clinical manifestations and a tendency by the intensivists to underestimate a possible favorable evolution. While some patients die, most survive, and of the survivors, approximately one-third recover; one-third are disabled but can live independently; one-third are severely disabled. Permanent disabilities range from minor tremors and ataxia to signs of severe brain damage, such as spastic quadriparesis and locked-in syndrome. Some improvements may be seen over the first several months after the condition stabilizes.

The degree of recovery depends on the extent of the original axonal damage.
