= Hyponatremia =

Low sodium concentration in the blood

- Other names: Hyponatraemia, low blood sodium, hyponatræmia
- Sodium, as shown on the periodic table
- Specialty: Nephrology
- Symptoms: Decreased ability to think, headaches, nausea, poor balance, confusion, seizures, coma
- Types: Low volume, normal volume, high volume
- Diagnostic method: Serum sodium < 135 mmol/L
- Differential diagnosis: Ethanol intoxication or withdrawal, high protein levels, high blood fat levels, high blood sugar
- Treatment: Based on underlying cause
- Frequency: Relatively common

Hyponatremia or hyponatraemia is a low concentration of sodium in the blood. It is generally defined as a sodium concentration of less than 135 mmol/L (135 mEq/L), with severe hyponatremia being below 120 mEq/L. Symptoms can be absent, mild or severe. Mild symptoms include a decreased ability to think, headaches, nausea, and poor balance. Severe symptoms include confusion, seizures, and coma; death can ensue.

The causes of hyponatremia are typically classified by a person's body fluid status into low volume, normal volume, or high volume. Low volume hyponatremia can occur from diarrhea, vomiting, diuretics, and sweating. Normal volume hyponatremia is divided into cases with dilute urine and concentrated urine. Cases in which the urine is dilute include adrenal insufficiency, hypothyroidism, and drinking too much water or too much beer. Cases in which the urine is concentrated include syndrome of inappropriate antidiuretic hormone secretion (SIADH). High volume hyponatremia can occur from heart failure, liver failure, and kidney failure. Conditions that can lead to falsely low sodium measurements include high blood protein levels such as in multiple myeloma, high blood fat levels, and high blood sugar.

Treatment is based on the underlying cause. Correcting hyponatremia too quickly can lead to complications. Rapid partial correction with 3% normal saline is only recommended in those with significant symptoms and occasionally those in whom the condition was of rapid onset. Low volume hyponatremia is typically treated with intravenous normal saline. SIADH is typically treated by correcting the underlying cause and with fluid restriction while high volume hyponatremia is typically treated with both fluid restriction and a diet low in salt. Correction should generally be gradual in those whom the low levels have been present for more than two days.

Hyponatremia is the most common type of electrolyte imbalance, and is often found in older adults. It occurs in about 20% of those admitted to hospital and 10% of people during or after an endurance sporting event. Among those in hospital, hyponatremia is associated with an increased risk of death. The economic costs of hyponatremia are estimated at $2.6 billion per annum in the United States.

== Signs and symptoms ==
Signs and symptoms of hyponatremia include nausea and vomiting, headache, short-term memory loss, confusion, lethargy, fatigue, loss of appetite, irritability, muscle weakness, spasms or cramps, seizures, and decreased consciousness or coma. Lower levels of plasma sodium are associated with more severe symptoms. However, mild hyponatremia (plasma sodium levels at 131–135 mmol/L) may be associated with complications and subtle symptoms (for example, increased falls, altered posture and gait, reduced attention, impaired cognition, and possibly higher rates of death).

Neurological symptoms typically occur with very low levels of plasma sodium (usually <115 mmol/L). When sodium levels in the blood become very low, water enters the brain cells and causes them to swell (cerebral edema). This results in increased pressure in the skull and causes hyponatremic encephalopathy. As pressure increases in the skull, herniation of the brain can occur. This can lead to headache, nausea, vomiting, confusion, seizures, brain stem compression and respiratory arrest, and non-cardiogenic accumulation of fluid in the lungs. This is usually fatal if not immediately treated.

Symptom severity depends on how fast and how severe the drop in blood sodium level is. A gradual drop, even to very low levels, may be tolerated well if it occurs over several days or weeks, because of neuronal adaptation. The presence of underlying neurological disease such as a seizure disorder or non-neurological metabolic abnormalities, also affects the severity of neurologic symptoms.

Hyponatremia, by interfering with bone metabolism, has been linked with a doubled risk of osteoporosis and an increased risk of bone fracture.

== Causes ==
The specific causes of hyponatremia are generally divided into those with low tonicity (lower than normal concentration of solutes), without low tonicity, and falsely low sodiums. Those with low tonicity are then grouped by whether the person has high fluid volume, normal fluid volume, or low fluid volume. Hyponatremia can also be a possible side effect of Pfizer COVID-19 vaccination.

=== High volume ===
Both sodium and water content increase: Increase in sodium content leads to hypervolemia and water content to hyponatremia.

- Cirrhosis of the liver
- Congestive heart failure
- Nephrotic syndrome in the kidneys
- Excessive water consumption (Water intoxication)

=== Normal volume ===
There is volume expansion in the body, no edema, but hyponatremia occurs

- SIADH (and its many causes)
- Hypothyroidism
- Not enough ACTH
- Beer potomania
- Normal physiologic change of pregnancy
- Reset osmostat
- Sick cell syndrome, a critical illness phenomenon associated with inability of cells across the board to maintain the usual Na+/K+ ratios between in the extracellular and intracellular spaces

=== Low volume ===
Hypovolemia (extracellular volume loss) is due to total body sodium loss. Hyponatremia is caused by a relatively smaller loss in total body water.

- Any cause of hypovolemia such as prolonged vomiting, decreased oral intake, severe diarrhea
- Diuretic use (due to the diuretic causing a volume depleted state and thence ADH release, and not a direct result of diuretic-induced urine sodium loss)
- Addison's disease and congenital adrenal hyperplasia in which the adrenal glands do not produce enough steroid hormones (combined glucocorticoid and mineralocorticoid deficiency)
- Isolated hyperchlorhidrosis (Carbonic anhydrase XII deficiency), a rare genetic disorder which results in a lifelong tendency to lose excessive amounts of sodium by sweating.
- Pancreatitis
- Prolonged exercise and sweating, combined with drinking water without electrolytes is the cause of exercise-associated hyponatremia (EAH). It is common in marathon runners and participants of other endurance events.
- The use of MDMA (ecstasy) can result in hyponatremia.

=== Medication ===
Antipsychotics have been reported to cause hyponatremia.

Available evidence suggests that all classes of psychotropics, i.e., antidepressants, antipsychotics, mood stabilizers, and sedative/hypnotics can lead to hyponatremia. Age is a significant factor for drug induced hyponatremia.

=== Other causes ===
Miscellaneous causes that are not included under the above classification scheme include the following:

- False or pseudo hyponatremia is caused by a false lab measurement of sodium due to massive increases in blood triglyceride levels or extreme elevation of immunoglobulins as may occur in multiple myeloma.
- Hyponatremia with elevated tonicity can occur with high blood sugar, causing a shift of excess free water into the serum.

== Pathophysiology ==
The causes of and treatments for hyponatremia can only be understood by having a grasp of the size of the body fluid compartments and subcompartments and their regulation; how under normal circumstances the body is able to maintain the sodium concentration within a narrow range (homeostasis of body fluid osmolality); conditions can cause that feedback system to malfunction (pathophysiology); and the consequences of the malfunction of that system on the size and solute concentration of the fluid compartments.

=== Normal homeostasis ===
There is a hypothalamic-kidney feedback system which normally maintains the concentration of the serum sodium within a narrow range. This system operates as follows: in some of the cells of the hypothalamus, there are osmoreceptors which respond to an elevated serum sodium in body fluids by signalling the posterior pituitary gland to secrete antidiuretic hormone (ADH) (vasopressin). ADH then enters the bloodstream and signals the kidney to bring back sufficient solute-free water from the fluid in the kidney tubules to dilute the serum sodium back to normal, and this turns off the osmoreceptors in the hypothalamus. Also, thirst is stimulated. Normally, when mild hyponatremia begins to occur, that is, the serum sodium begins to fall below 135 mEq/L, there is no secretion of ADH, and the kidney stops returning water to the body from the kidney tubule. Also, no thirst is experienced. These two act in concert to raise the serum sodium to the normal range.

=== Hyponatremia ===
Hyponatremia occurs 1) when the hypothalamic-kidney feedback loop is overwhelmed by increased fluid intake, 2) the feedback loop malfunctions such that ADH is always "turned on", 3) the receptors in the kidney are always "open" regardless of there being no signal from ADH to be open; or 4) there is an increased ADH even though there is no normal stimulus (elevated serum sodium) for ADH to be increased.

Hyponatremia occurs in one of two ways: either the osmoreceptor-aquaporin feedback loop is overwhelmed, or it is interrupted. If it is interrupted, it is either related or not related to ADH. If the feedback system is overwhelmed, this is water intoxication with maximally dilute urine and is caused by 1) pathological water drinking (psychogenic polydipsia), 2) beer potomania, 3) overzealous intravenous solute free water infusion, or 4) infantile water intoxication. "Impairment of urine diluting ability related to ADH" occurs in nine situations: 1) arterial volume depletion 2) hemodynamically mediated, 3) congestive heart failure, 4) cirrhosis, 5) nephrosis, 6) spinal cord disease, 7) Addison's disease, 8) cerebral salt wasting, and 9) syndrome of inappropriate antidiuretic hormone secretion (SIADH). If the feed-back system is normal, but an impairment of urine diluting ability unrelated to ADH occurs, this is 1) oliguric kidney failure, 2) tubular interstitial kidney disease, 3) diuretics, or 4) nephrogenic syndrome of antidiuresis.

Sodium is the primary positively charged ion outside of the cell and cannot cross from the interstitial space into the cell. This is because charged sodium ions attract around them up to 25 water molecules, thereby creating a large polar structure too large to pass through the cell membrane: "channels" or "pumps" are required. Cell swelling also produces activation of volume-regulated anion channels which is related to the release of taurine and glutamate from astrocytes.

== Diagnosis ==
The history, physical exam, and laboratory testing are required to determine the underlying cause of hyponatremia. A blood test demonstrating a serum sodium less than 135 mmol/L is diagnostic for hyponatremia. The history and physical exam are necessary to help determine if the person is hypovolemic, euvolemic, or hypervolemic, which has important implications in determining the underlying cause. An assessment is also made to determine if the person is experiencing symptoms from their hyponatremia. These include assessments of alertness, concentration, and orientation.

Short synacthen test (ACTH stimulation test) is essential as early endocrine evaluation in patients with suspected adrenal insufficiency to avoid misdiagnosis of life-threatening hypoadrenalism that can be devoid of classical hyperkalemia and hypotension.

Moreover, cerebral salt wasting, a type of hypovolemic hyponatremia, which may develop days after subarachnoid hemorrhage, neurosurgery, or stroke, has now been identified as a separate condition caused by increased brain-derived natriuretic peptides and requiring volume replacement instead of fluid restriction.

=== False hyponatremia ===
False hyponatremia, also known as spurious, pseudo, hypertonic, or artifactual hyponatremia is when the lab tests read low sodium levels but there is no hypotonicity. In hypertonic hyponatremia, resorption of water by molecules such as glucose (hyperglycemia or diabetes) or mannitol (hypertonic infusion) occurs. In isotonic hyponatremia a measurement error due to high blood triglyceride level (most common) or paraproteinemia occurs. It occurs when using techniques that measure the amount of sodium in a specified volume of serum/plasma, or that dilute the sample before analysis.

=== True hyponatremia ===
True hyponatremia, also known as hypotonic hyponatremia, is the most common type. It is often simply referred to as "hyponatremia". Hypotonic hyponatremia is categorized in 3 ways based on the person's blood volume status. Each category represents a different underlying reason for the increase in ADH that led to the water retention and thence hyponatremia:

- High volume hyponatremia, wherein there is decreased effective circulating volume (less blood flowing in the body) even though total body volume is increased (by the presence of edema or swelling, especially in the ankles). The decreased effective circulating volume stimulates the release of anti-diuretic hormone (ADH), which in turn leads to water retention. Hypervolemic hyponatremia is most commonly the result of congestive heart failure, liver failure, or kidney disease.
- Normal volume hyponatremia, wherein the increase in ADH is secondary to either physiologic but excessive ADH release (as occurs with nausea or severe pain) or inappropriate and non-physiologic secretion of ADH, that is, syndrome of inappropriate antidiuretic hormone hypersecretion (SIADH). Often categorized under euvolemic is hyponatremia due to inadequate urine solute (not enough chemicals or electrolytes to produce urine) as occurs in beer potomania or "tea and toast" hyponatremia, hyponatremia due to hypothyroidism or central adrenal insufficiency, and those rare instances of hyponatremia that are truly secondary to excess water intake.
- Low volume hyponatremia, wherein ADH secretion is stimulated by or associated with volume depletion (not enough water in the body) due to decreased effective circulating volume.

=== Acute versus chronic ===
Chronic hyponatremia is when sodium levels drop gradually over several days or weeks and symptoms and complications are typically moderate. Chronic hyponatremia is often called asymptomatic hyponatremia in clinical settings because it is thought to have no symptoms; however, emerging data suggests that "asymptomatic" hyponatremia is not actually asymptomatic.

Acute hyponatremia is when sodium levels drop rapidly, resulting in potentially dangerous effects, such as rapid brain swelling, which can result in coma and death.

== Treatment ==
The treatment of hyponatremia depends on the underlying cause. How quickly treatment is required depends on a person's symptoms. Fluids are typically the cornerstone of initial management. In those with severe disease an increase in sodium of about 5 mmol/L over one to four hours is recommended. A rapid rise in serum sodium is anticipated in certain groups when the cause of the hyponatremia is addressed thus warranting closer monitoring in order to avoid overly rapid correction of the blood sodium concentration. These groups include persons who have hypovolemic hyponatremia and receive intravenous fluids (thus correcting their hypovolemia), persons with adrenal insufficiency who receive hydrocortisone, persons in whom a medication causing increased ADH release has been stopped, and persons who have hyponatremia due to decreased salt and/or solute intake in their diet who are treated with a higher solute diet. If large volumes of dilute urine are seen, this can be a warning sign that overcorrection is imminent in these individuals.

Sodium deficit = (140 – serum sodium) × total body water

Total body water = kilograms of body weight × 0.6

=== Fluids ===
Options include:

- Mild and asymptomatic hyponatremia is treated with adequate solute intake (including salt and protein) and fluid restriction starting at 500 millilitres per day (mL/d) of water with adjustments based on serum sodium levels. Long-term fluid restriction of 1,200–1,800 mL/d may maintain the person in a symptom-free state.
- Moderate and/or symptomatic hyponatremia is treated by raising the serum sodium level by 0.5 to 1 mmol per liter per hour for a total of 8 mmol per liter during the first day with the use of furosemide and replacing sodium and potassium losses with 0.9% saline.
- Severe hyponatremia or severe symptoms (confusion, convulsions, or coma): consider hypertonic saline (3%) 1–2 mL/kg IV in 3–4 h. Hypertonic saline may lead to a rapid dilute diuresis and fall in the serum sodium. It should not be used in those with an expanded extracellular fluid volume.

=== Electrolyte abnormalities ===
In persons with hyponatremia due to low blood volume (hypovolemia) from diuretics with simultaneous low blood potassium levels, correction of the low potassium level can assist with correction of hyponatremia.

=== Medications ===
American and European guidelines come to different conclusions regarding the use of medications. In the United States they are recommended in those with SIADH, cirrhosis, or heart failure who fail limiting fluid intake. In Europe they are not generally recommended.

There is tentative evidence that vasopressin receptor antagonists (vaptans), such as conivaptan, may be slightly more effective than fluid restriction in those with high volume or normal volume hyponatremia. They should not be used in people with low volume. They may also be used in people with chronic hyponatremia due to SIADH that is insufficiently responsive to fluid restriction and/or sodium tablets.

Demeclocycline, while sometimes used for SIADH, has significant side effects including potential kidney problems and sun sensitivity. In many people it has no benefit while in others it can result in overcorrection and high blood sodium levels.

Daily use of urea by mouth, while not commonly used due to the taste, has tentative evidence in SIADH. However, it is not available in many areas of the world.

=== Precautions ===
Raising the serum sodium concentration too rapidly may cause osmotic demyelination syndrome. Rapid correction of sodium levels can also lead to central pontine myelinolysis (CPM). It is recommended not to raise the serum sodium by more than 10 mEq/L/day.

== Epidemiology ==
Hyponatremia is the most commonly seen water–electrolyte imbalance. The disorder is more frequent in females, the elderly, and in people who are hospitalized. The number of cases of hyponatremia depends largely on the population. In hospital it affects about 15–20% of people; however, only 3–5% of people who are hospitalized have a sodium level less than 130 mmol/L. Hyponatremia has been reported in up to 30% of the elderly in nursing homes and is also present in approximately 30% of people who are depressed on selective serotonin reuptake inhibitors.

People who have hyponatremia who require hospitalisation have a longer length of stay (with associated increased costs) and also have a higher likelihood of requiring readmission. This is particularly the case in men and in the elderly.
