= Nephrogenic diabetes insipidus =

Impaired renal function disease

- Other names: Arginine vasopressin resistance, renal diabetes insipidus
- Specialty: Nephrology, endocrinology, urology, medical genetics
- Symptoms: Polyuria, nocturia, polydipsia
- Complications: Dehydration, seizures, hypernatremia
- Types: Congenital and acquired
- Diagnostic method: Urine tests, blood tests, fluid deprivation test, genetic tests
- Differential diagnosis: AVP-D (central), primary polydipsia, diabetes mellitus
- Treatment: Drinking sufficient fluids, low sodium and low solute diet, medications
- Medication: Thiazides, aspirin
- Frequency: 3 per 100,000 per year

Nephrogenic diabetes insipidus (NDI), also known as arginine vasopressin resistance (AVP-R) and previously known as renal diabetes insipidus, is a form of diabetes insipidus primarily due to pathology of the kidney. This is in contrast to central or neurogenic diabetes insipidus, which is caused by insufficient levels of vasopressin (also called antidiuretic hormone, ADH). Nephrogenic diabetes insipidus is caused by an improper response of the kidney to vasopressin (AVP), leading to a decrease in the ability of the kidney to concentrate the urine by removing free water.

== Signs and symptoms ==
The clinical manifestation is similar to neurogenic diabetes insipidus, presenting with polydipsia (excessive thirst) and polyuria (excretion of a large amount of dilute urine). Dehydration is common, and incontinence can occur secondary to chronic bladder distension. On investigation, there will be an increased plasma osmolarity and decreased urine osmolarity. As pituitary function is normal, antidiuretic hormone levels are likely to be abnormal or raised. Polyuria will continue as long as the patient is able to drink. If the patient is unable to drink and is still unable to concentrate the urine, then hypernatremia will ensue with its neurologic symptoms.

== Causes ==
=== Acquired ===
Nephrogenic diabetes insipidus is most common in its acquired forms, meaning that the defect was not present at birth. These acquired forms have numerous potential causes. The most obvious cause is a kidney or systemic disorder, including amyloidosis, polycystic kidney disease, electrolyte imbalance, or some other kidney defect.

The major causes of acquired nephrogenic diabetes insipidus that produce clinical symptoms (e.g., polyuria) in the adult are lithium toxicity and high blood calcium. About 80% of lithium ingested appears to affect the proximal tubules by entering the collecting tubule cells through sodium channels. It disrupts intracellular signaling by inducing impairment in producing cAMP and thus inhibiting the pathways that normally promote aquaporin-2 (AQP2) expression and insertion into the apical membrane, thereby interfering with the normal response to antidiuretic hormone. High blood calcium causes natriuresis (increased sodium loss in the urine) and water diuresis, in part by its effect through the calcium-sensing receptor.

=== Osmotic ===
Other causes of acquired nephrogenic diabetes insipidus include hypokalemia (low blood potassium), post-obstructive polyuria, sickle cell disease or trait, amyloidosis, Sjögren syndrome, renal cystic disease, Bartter syndrome, and various medications (amphotericin B, orlistat, ifosfamide, ofloxacin, cidofovir, vaptans).

In addition to kidney and systemic disorders, nephrogenic diabetes insipidus can present itself as a side effect of some medications. The most common and well known of these medications is lithium, although there are many other medications that cause this effect with lesser frequency.

=== Hereditary ===
This form of diabetes insipidus can also be hereditary due to defects in the following genes:

Type	OMIM	Gene	Locus
NDI1	304800	AVPR2	Usually, the hereditary form of nephrogenic diabetes insipidus is the result of an X-linked genetic defect which causes the vasopressin receptor (also called the V2 receptor) in the kidney to not function correctly.
NDI2	125800	AQP2	In more rare cases, a mutation in the "aquaporin 2" gene impedes the normal functionality of the kidney water channel, which results in the kidney being unable to absorb water. This mutation is often inherited in an autosomal recessive manner although dominant mutations are reported from time to time.

== Diagnosis ==
Differential diagnosis includes nephrogenic diabetes insipidus, neurogenic/central diabetes insipidus and primary polydipsia. They may be differentiated by using the water deprivation test. Recently, lab assays for antidiuretic hormone are available and can aid in diagnosis. If the patient is able to rehydrate properly, sodium concentration should be nearer to the maximum of the normal range. This, however, is not a diagnostic finding, as it depends on patient hydration.

Desmopressin can also be used; if the patient is able to concentrate urine following administration of desmopressin, then the cause of the diabetes insipidus is neurogenic diabetes insipidus; if no response occurs to desmopressin, then the cause is likely to be nephrogenic.

== Treatment ==
Persons with nephrogenic diabetes insipidus must consume enough fluids to equal the amount of urine produced. Any underlying cause such as high blood calcium must be corrected to treat nephrogenic diabetes insipidus. The first line of treatment is hydrochlorothiazide and amiloride. In lithium-induced NDI, amiloride is believed to work by blocking the epithelial sodium channel (ENaC) on the apical membrane of collecting duct principal cells, thereby reducing lithium entry into these cells and reducing lithium's downstream effects on urine concentrating mechanisms. Patients may also consider a low-salt and low-protein diet.

Thiazide diuretics cause a mild decrease in extracellular fluid volume through natriuresis and diuresis which in turn increases the proximal absorption of sodium and water, lowering urine output.

High serum osmolarity stimulates polydipsia in an attempt to dilute the serum back to normal and provide free water for excreting the excess serum solutes. However, since the patient is unable to concentrate urine to excrete the excess solutes, the resulting urine fails to decrease serum osmolarity and the cycle repeats itself, hence polyuria.

== Etymology ==
The name of the disease comes from:

- diabetes: from Latin: diabetes, from Ancient Greek: διαβήτης diabḗtēs "a passer-through; siphon", from Greek διαβαίνειν diabaínein "to pass through", from δια- dia- "through" + βαίνειν baínein "to go".
- insipidus: from Late Latin: insipidus "tasteless," from Latin in- "not" + sapidus "tasty", from sapere "to taste".

This is because patients experience polyuria (an excretion of over 2.5 liters of urine per day), and the urine does not have an elevated glucose concentration, as opposed to diabetes mellitus. The two diseases were named (in ancient times) for the fact that one features polyuria in which the urine tastes sweet, whereas the other features polyuria in which the urine tastes unremarkable.

Although they share part of their names, diabetes mellitus and diabetes insipidus are two separate conditions. Both cause excessive urination (hence the similarity in name), but whereas diabetes insipidus is a problem with the production of antidiuretic hormone (neurogenic diabetes insipidus) or the kidneys' response to antidiuretic hormone (nephrogenic diabetes insipidus), diabetes mellitus causes polyuria via osmotic diuresis, due to the high blood sugar leaking into the urine, taking excess water along with it.
