= Urine specific gravity =

Topic related to human medicine

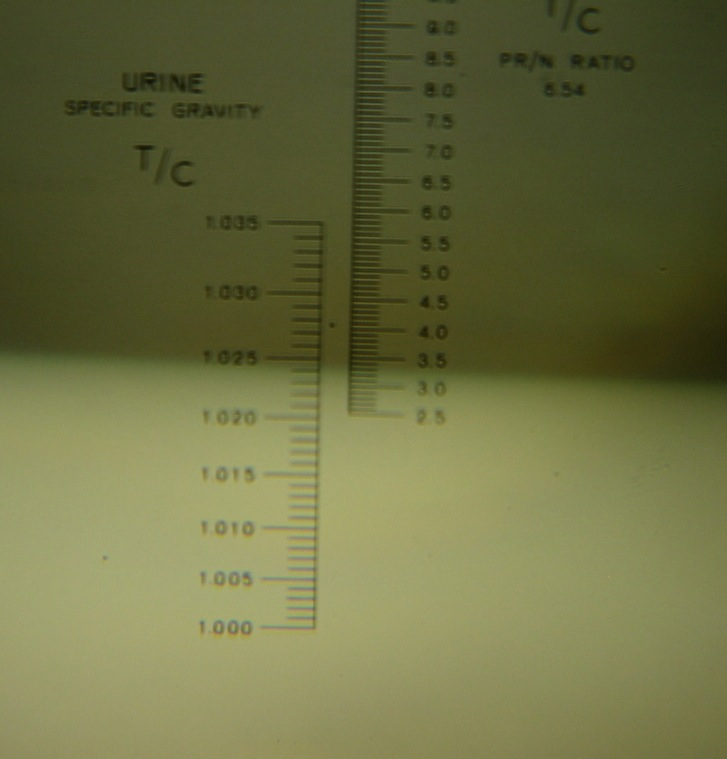
- Reading of a urine specific gravity of ~1.024 via a handheld refractometer. SG measurement is taken by reading the boundary between the dark and light fields against the graduations on the left column.
- Purpose: evaluation of kidney function

Specific gravity, in the context of clinical pathology, is a urinalysis parameter commonly used in the evaluation of kidney function and can aid in the diagnosis of various renal diseases.

== Background ==
One of the main roles of the kidneys in humans and other mammals is to aid in the clearance of various water-soluble molecules, including toxins, toxicants, and metabolic waste. The body excretes some of these waste molecules via urination, and the role of the kidney is to concentrate the urine, such that waste molecules can be excreted with minimal loss of water and nutrients. The concentration of the excreted molecules determines the urine's specific gravity. In adult humans, normal specific gravity values range from 1.010 to 1.030.

== Specific gravity and disease ==
Adults generally have a specific gravity in the range of 1.010 to 1.030. Increases in specific gravity (hypersthenuria, i.e. increased concentration of solutes in the urine) may be associated with dehydration, diarrhea, emesis, excessive sweating, urinary tract/bladder infection, glucosuria, renal artery stenosis, hepatorenal syndrome, decreased blood flow to the kidney (especially as a result of heart failure), and an excess of antidiuretic hormone caused by the syndrome of inappropriate antidiuretic hormone secretion. A specific gravity greater than 1.035 is consistent with frank dehydration. In neonates, normal urine specific gravity is 1.003. Hypovolemic patients usually have a specific gravity >1.015.

Decreased specific gravity (hyposthenuria, i.e. decreased concentration of solutes in urine) may be associated with renal failure, pyelonephritis, diabetes insipidus, acute tubular necrosis, interstitial nephritis, and excessive fluid intake (e.g., psychogenic polydipsia).

Osmolality is normally used for more detailed analysis, but urine specific gravity remains popular for its convenience.
