= Central diabetes insipidus =

- Other names: Arginine vasopressin deficiency; AVP-D; pituitary diabetes insipidus; neurohypophyseal diabetes insipidus; cranial diabetes insipidus; neurogenic diabetes insipidus
- Specialty: Endocrinology
- Symptoms: Polyuria, nocturia, and polydipsia.
- Complications: Dehydration, seizures
- Usual onset: Any age
- Diagnostic method: Urine tests, blood tests, fluid deprivation test
- Differential diagnosis: AVP-R (nephrogenic), Primary polydipsia, Diabetes mellitus
- Treatment: Drinking sufficient fluids
- Medication: Desmopressin
- Frequency: 3 per 100,000 per year

Central diabetes insipidus, also known as arginine vasopressin deficiency (AVP-D), is a form of diabetes insipidus that is due to a lack of vasopressin (ADH) production in the brain. Vasopressin acts to increase the volume of blood (intravascularly), and decrease the volume of urine produced. Therefore, a lack of it causes increased urine production and volume depletion.

It is also known as neurohypophyseal diabetes insipidus, referring to the posterior pituitary (neurohypophysis), which receives vasopressin from the hypothalamus in the brain, via the hypothalamo-hypophyseal tract in the pituitary stalk. This condition has only polyuria in common with diabetes. Although not mutually exclusive, with most typical cases, the name diabetes insipidus is misleading.

Untreated patients with central diabetes insipidus often experience polyuria, nocturia, and polydipsia due to the initial increase in serum sodium and osmolality. Central diabetes insipidus can be caused by various congenital or acquired lesions, and when the cause is unknown, it is classified as idiopathic.

The water deprivation test (WDT) is a commonly used test for diabetes insipidus, a two-step process involving parenteral desmopressin administration after an initial 8-hour water fast. It differentiates primary polydipsia from diabetes insipidus and central diabetes insipidus from nephrogenic diabetes insipidus. Diabetes insipidus is treated by restoring free water deficit, replacing the missing hormone, and addressing the underlying ailment. Desmopressin, an arginine vasopressin analog, is used to treat central diabetes insipidus.

== Signs and symptoms ==
Untreated central diabetes insipidus patients usually exhibit polyuria, nocturia, and polydipsia as a result of the initial rise of serum sodium and osmolality. Patients may also experience neurologic symptoms associated with the underlying illness, such as headaches and diplopia, depending on the exact origin of the central diabetes insipidus.

Even when their polyuria and polydipsia are adequately managed, patients with central diabetes insipidus frequently suffer psychological symptoms as elevated anxiety, social isolation, and an overall lower quality of life.

People with central diabetes insipidus also show oxytocin deficiency and have greatly blunted oxytocin increases and markedly reduced entactogenic effects such as euphoria, increased empathy, and reduced anxiety with MDMA.

== Causes ==
The clinical manifestation of central diabetes insipidus is the lack of arginine vasopressin secretion as a result of the hypothalamus/posterior pituitary axis neurons being destroyed. Numerous different congenital or acquired lesions can cause the condition.

=== Idiopathic ===
When the causes of central diabetes insipidus are unknown, the condition is categorized as idiopathic.

=== Acquired ===
Central diabetes insipidus is typically an acquired disorder. The following conditions may result in central diabetes insipidus:

1. Surgery - Neurosurgery, typically in the sellar or suprasellar area, can induce central diabetes insipidus. In most neurosurgery-related situations, central diabetes insipidus is temporary. It is rare to have persistent postoperative central diabetes insipidus.
2. Neoplastic conditions - Central diabetes insipidus can result from primary or secondary brain malignancies that affect the hypothalamic-pituitary area; secondary tumors are typically caused by metastasis from lung or breast cancer, leukemia, or lymphoma. Additionally, central diabetes insipidus is seen in myelodysplastic syndrome. Craniopharyngioma, germinoma, pinealoma, glioma, and meningioma can all cause central diabetes insipidus.
3. Trauma - Central diabetes insipidus can be caused by head trauma that affects the posterior pituitary and hypothalamus.
4. Vascular disorders - Vascular disorders such as subarachnoid hemorrhage, intracranial hemorrhage, and Sheehan's syndrome have been known to cause central diabetes insipidus.
5. Inflammation/Infection - Central diabetes insipidus has been linked to sarcoid, histiocytosis, granulomatosis with polyangiitis, post-tuberculosis meningitis, HIV, COVID-19, post encephalitis, toxoplasmosis, abscess, and systemic lupus erythematosus.
6. Autoimmune - It is thought that the degeneration of the hormone-secreting cells in the hypothalamus nuclei accounts for between 30 and 50 percent of nontraumatic central diabetes insipidus cases. Many, if not most, of these individuals may be affected by an autoimmune process. Pituitary stalk and posterior pituitary lymphocytic inflammation is a hallmark of the autoimmune process. Lymphocytic infundibuloneurohypophysitis (LINH) is the name of the disease process that most likely explains autoimmune cases of central diabetes insipidus.
7. Pregnancy - Pregnancy can cause central diabetes insipidus due to vasopressinase enzyme.
8. Central nervous system malformation - Malformations in the central nervous system such as septo-optic dysplasia, agenesis of corpus callosum, empty sella syndrome, and pituitary hypoplasia can cause central diabetes insipidus.
9. Brain death - Central diabetes insipidus is seen in roughly half of brain dead patients and is due to pituitary infarction caused by lack of blood supply to the pituitary gland from the brain via the hypothalamo-hypophyseal portal blood supply system.

=== Genetic ===
Central diabetes insipidus is linked to several congenital and familial disorders. These include congenital hypopituitarism, septo-optic dysplasia, familial arginine vasopressin deficiency, Wolfram syndrome (WFS1 gene mutation), and proprotein convertase subtilisin/kexin type 1 (PCSK1) gene deficiency. The main mutations are associated with the AVP gene.

== Diagnosis ==
Establishing whether hypotonic polyuria exists is the first stage in the diagnostic process. Urine production over 50 mL/kg body weight in adults has been characterized as polyuria on 24-hour urine collection and has also been arbitrarily defined as more than 3 L/day.

Confounding diseases such diabetes mellitus, renal impairment, hyperglycemia, hypercalcemia, and hypokalemia should be ruled out by baseline laboratory testing once polyuria is established. Because individuals with central diabetes insipidus are more likely than those with primary polyuria to have plasma sodium concentrations at the upper end of the normal reference range, measuring ambulatory plasma sodium concentration is beneficial.

The most often utilized test for diabetes insipidus is the water deprivation test (WDT). This is a two-step test where parenteral desmopressin is administered after an initial 8-hour water fast. The first step is designed to differentiate primary polydipsia from diabetes insipidus. The second part of the test helps differentiate central diabetes insipidus from nephrogenic diabetes insipidus.

Measurement of the arginine vasopressin responses during the intravenous infusion of hypertonic (3%–5%) sodium chloride solution can assist in differentiating between central diabetes insipidus and nephrogenic diabetes insipidus or primary polydipsia if the WDT is unable to provide a definitive diagnosis.

It has been suggested to measure plasma copeptin as a stand-in for measuring plasma arginine vasopressin. Measurement of thirst using an unmarked, basic 10-cm visual analogue scale has revealed that the start of thirst happens at the same osmotic threshold as arginine vasopressin secretion. In patients with central diabetes insipidus, thirst responses exhibit a physiological pattern of linear rise during osmotic stimulation and reduction following water consumption.

Following a diagnosis of central diabetes insipidus, MRI scanning of the hypothalamo-pituitary region is necessary to determine whether central diabetes insipidus is caused by a structural lesion.

== Treatment ==
In order to treat diabetes insipidus, the free water deficit must be restored, the missing hormone must be replaced (if central diabetes insipidus is present), and the underlying ailment must be addressed. The medication desmopressin, an arginine vasopressin analogue, is used to treat central diabetes insipidus.

== See also ==
- Fluid deprivation test
- Diabetes insipidus
