= Fluid deprivation test =

Fluid/water deprivation test
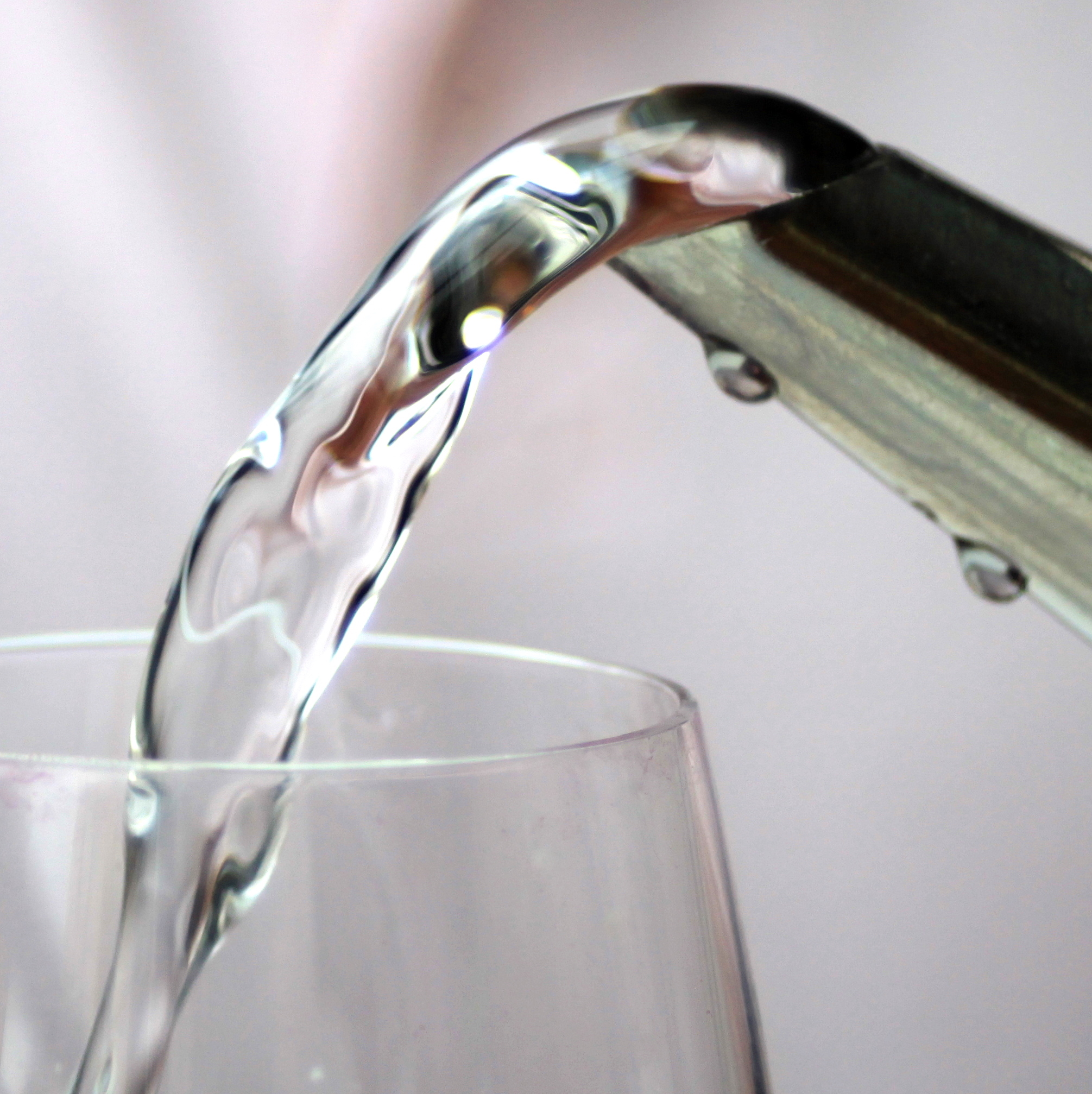
- OPS-301 code: 1-797

A fluid or water deprivation test is a medical test which can be used to determine whether the patient has diabetes insipidus as opposed to other causes of polydipsia (a condition of excessive thirst that causes an excessive intake of water). The patient is required, for a prolonged period, to forgo intake of water completely, to determine the cause of the thirst.

This test measures changes in body weight, urine output, and urine composition when fluids are withheld. Sometimes measuring blood levels of ADH (a synonym for vasopressin) during this test is also necessary.

If there is no change in the water loss despite fluid deprivation, desmopressin may be administered to distinguish between the two types of diabetes insipidus which are central & nephrogenic diabetes insipidus.

The time of deprivation may vary from 4 to 18 hours.

The serum osmolality and urine osmolality are both measured in the test.

== Interpretation of WDT ==
The conditions can be distinguished in the following way:

Condition	Urine osmolality in mOsm/kg, after fluid deprivation	After desmopressin or vasopressin
Normal	> 800	> 800 (<10% increase)
a defect in ADH production (central/neurogenic diabetes insipidus)	< 300	> 800 (>50% increase)
partial defect in ADH production (central/neurogenic diabetes insipidus)	300-800	> 800 (>9% increase)
a defect in the kidneys' response to ADH production (nephrogenic diabetes insipidus)	< 300	< 500 (<50% increase)
excessive intake of fluid (primary polydipsia)	> 500	> 500 (<10% increase)
