= Hypernatremia =

High sodium concentration in the blood

- Other names: Hypernatraemia
- Sodium
- Specialty: Hospital medicine
- Symptoms: Feeling of thirst, weakness, nausea, loss of appetite
- Complications: Cardiac arrest, confusion, muscle twitching, bleeding in or around the brain
- Types: Low volume, normal volume, high volume
- Diagnostic method: Serum sodium > 145 mmol/L
- Differential diagnosis: Low blood protein levels
- Frequency: ~0.5% in hospital

Hypernatremia, also spelled hypernatraemia, is a high concentration of sodium in the blood. Early symptoms may include a strong feeling of thirst, weakness, nausea, and loss of appetite. Severe symptoms include confusion, muscle twitching, and bleeding in or around the brain. Normal serum sodium levels are 135–145 mmol/L (135–145 mEq/L). Hypernatremia is generally defined as a serum sodium level of more than 145 mmol/L. Severe symptoms typically only occur when levels are above 160 mmol/L.

Hypernatremia is typically classified by a person's fluid status into low volume, normal volume, and high volume. Low volume hypernatremia can occur from sweating, vomiting, diarrhea, diuretic medication, or kidney disease. Normal volume hypernatremia can be due to fever, extreme thirst, prolonged increased breath rate, diabetes insipidus, and from lithium among other causes. High volume hypernatremia can be due to hyperaldosteronism, excessive administration of intravenous normal saline or sodium bicarbonate, or rarely from eating too much salt. Low blood protein levels can result in a falsely high sodium measurement. The cause can usually be determined by the history of events. Testing the urine can help if the cause is unclear. The underlying mechanism typically involves too little free water in the body.

If the onset of hypernatremia was over a few hours, then it can be corrected relatively quickly using intravenous normal saline and 5% dextrose in water. Otherwise, correction should occur slowly with, for those unable to drink water, half-normal saline. Hypernatremia due to diabetes insipidus as a result of a brain disorder, may be treated with the medication desmopressin. If the diabetes insipidus is due to kidney problems the medication causing the problem may need to be stopped or the underlying electrolyte disturbance corrected. Hypernatremia affects 0.3–1% of people in hospital. It most often occurs in babies, those with impaired mental status, and the elderly. Hypernatremia is associated with an increased risk of death, but it is unclear if it is the cause.

== Signs and symptoms ==
The major symptom is thirst. The most important signs result from brain cell shrinkage and include confusion, muscle twitching or spasms. With severe elevations, seizures and comas may occur.

Severe symptoms are usually due to acute elevation of the plasma sodium concentration to above 157 mmol/L (normal blood levels are generally about 135–145 mmol/L for adults and elderly). Values above 180 mmol/L are associated with a high mortality rate, particularly in adults. However, such high levels of sodium rarely occur without severe coexisting medical conditions. Serum sodium concentrations have ranged from 150 to 228 mmol/L in survivors of acute salt overdosage, while levels of 153–255 mmol/L have been observed in fatalities. Vitreous humor is considered to be a better postmortem specimen than postmortem serum for assessing sodium involvement in a death.

== Cause ==
Common causes of hypernatremia include:

=== Low volume ===
In those with low volume or hypovolemia:

- Inadequate intake of free water associated with total body sodium depletion. Typically in elderly or otherwise disabled patients who are unable to take in water as their thirst dictates and also are sodium depleted. This is the most common cause of hypernatremia.
- Excessive losses of water from the urinary tract – which may be caused by glycosuria, or other osmotic diuretics (e.g., mannitol) – leads to a combination of sodium and free water losses.
- Water losses associated with extreme sweating.
- Severe watery diarrhea (osmotic diarrhea results in hypotonic (dilute) watery diarrhea resulting in significant loss of free water and a higher concentration of sodium in the blood; this type of water loss can also be seen with viral gastroenteritis).

=== Normal volume ===
In those with normal volume or euvolemia:

- Excessive excretion of water from the kidneys caused by diabetes insipidus, which involves either inadequate release of antidiuretic hormone from the pituitary gland, or impaired responsiveness of the kidneys to it.

=== High volume ===
In those with high volume or hypervolemia:

- Intake of a hypertonic fluid (a fluid with a higher concentration of solutes than the remainder of the body) with restricted free water intake. This is relatively uncommon, though it can occur after a vigorous resuscitation where a patient receives a large volume of a concentrated sodium bicarbonate solution. Ingesting seawater also causes hypernatremia because seawater is hypertonic and free water is not available. There are several recorded cases of forced ingestion of concentrated salt solution in exorcism rituals leading to death.
- Mineralcorticoid excess due to a disease state such as Conn's syndrome usually does not lead to hypernatremia unless free water intake is restricted.
- Salt poisoning is the most common cause in children. It has also been seen in a number of adults with mental health problems. Too much salt can also occur from drinking seawater or soy sauce.

== Diagnosis ==
Hypernatremia is diagnosed when a basic metabolic panel blood test demonstrates a sodium concentration higher than 145 mmol/L.

== Treatment ==
The cornerstone of treatment is administration of free water to correct the relative water deficit. Water can be replaced orally or intravenously. Water alone cannot be administered intravenously (because of osmolarity issues leading to rupturing of red blood cells in the bloodstream), but rather can be given intravenously in solution with dextrose (sugar) or saline (salt). However, overly rapid correction of hypernatremia is potentially very dangerous. The body (in particular the brain) adapts to the higher sodium concentration. Rapidly lowering the sodium concentration with free water, once this adaptation has occurred, causes water to flow into brain cells and causes them to swell. This can lead to cerebral edema, potentially resulting in seizures, permanent brain damage, or death. Therefore, significant hypernatremia should be treated carefully by a physician or other medical professional with experience in treatment of electrolyte imbalance. Specific treatments such as thiazide diuretics (e.g., chlorthalidone) in congestive heart failure or corticosteroids in nephropathy also can be used.

== See also ==
- Hyponatremia — low sodium levels in blood.
- Salt poisoning — intoxication from excess salt intake.
- Salt water aspiration syndrome — a medical condition caused by the inhalation or aspiration of small amounts of salt water.
