= Oxytocin deficiency =

- Other names: OT deficiency; OXT deficiency
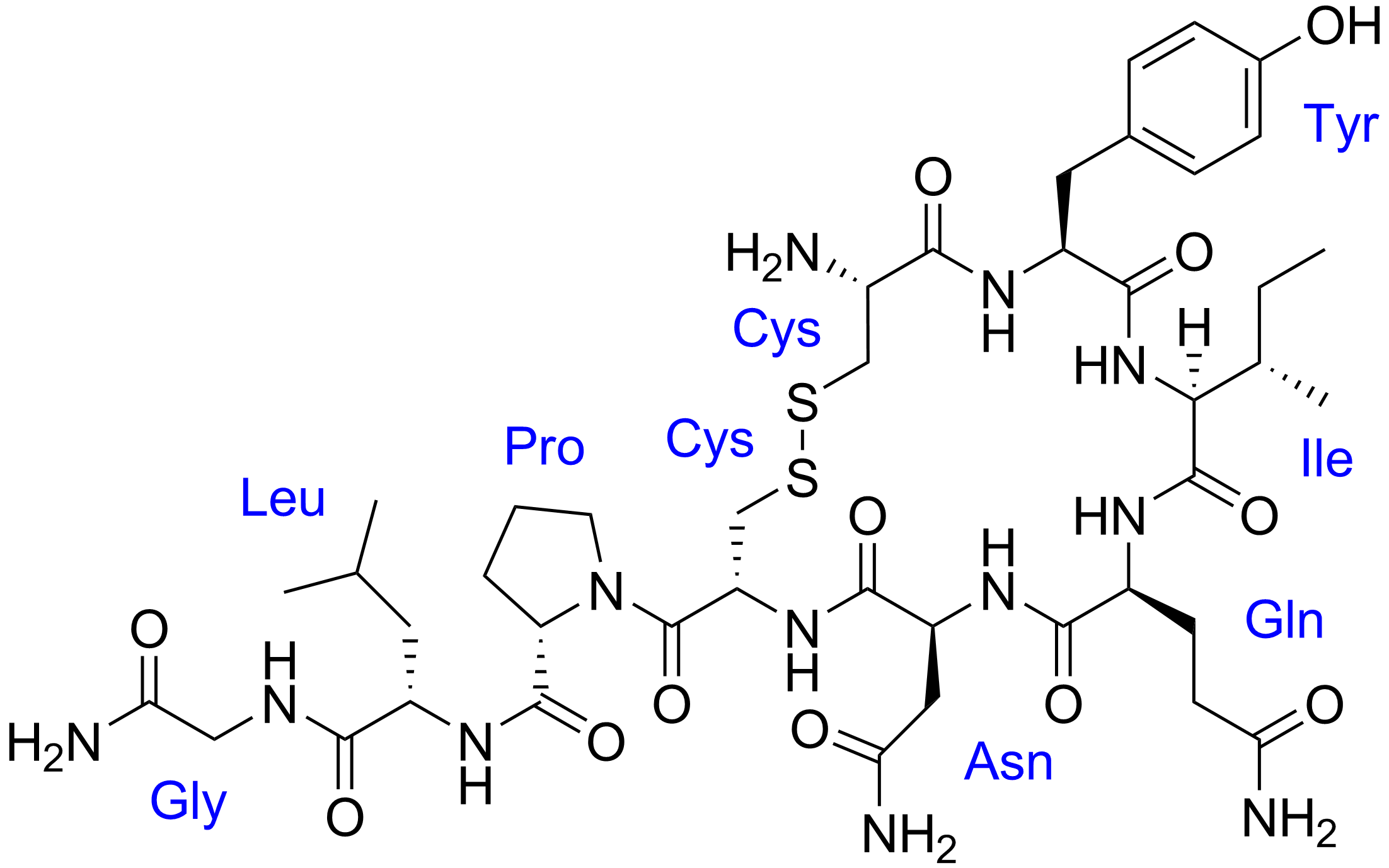
- Chemical structure of oxytocin
- Specialty: Endocrinology
- Symptoms: Social deficits, anxiety, depression, others
- Causes: Hypopituitarism, arginine vasopressin deficiency, craniopharyngioma, others
- Diagnostic method: Not currently available (but oxytocin-elevating provocation tests such as MDMA in research settings)
- Treatment: Not currently available
- Medication: Not currently available (but oxytocin receptor agonists like oxytocin under research)

Oxytocin deficiency is a rare medical condition in which oxytocin secretion and/or levels are deficient. Symptoms may include social deficits, anxiety, and depression, among others. It is associated with conditions like hypopituitarism, arginine vasopressin deficiency (central diabetes insipidus), and craniopharyngioma, among others.

There is currently no diagnostic test for oxytocin deficiency in routine clinical settings. However, it can be diagnosed via provocation tests in research settings, for instance with the oxytocin-elevating drug MDMA. Efforts are underway towards developing diagnostic tests for oxytocin deficiency with alternative approaches, for instance acute estrogen challenge.

No treatment for oxytocin deficiency is currently available. However, clinical trials of exogenous intranasal oxytocin substitution therapy for the condition are underway. Oxytocin itself suffers from major pharmacokinetic drawbacks that may limit its usefulness. In addition, tolerance or tachyphylaxis may occur with continuous therapy. Other potential options for oxytocin therapy under investigation include small-molecule oxytocin receptor agonists like LIT-001 and drugs that increase oxytocin production and hence indirectly exert oxytocin-like effects like KNX-100.

Oxytocin deficiency was first formally identified and documented in 2023. It was found in people with arginine vasopressin deficiency using MDMA provocation. Since then, efforts are being made towards diagnosis and treatment of the condition.

== Symptoms ==
Oxytocin deficiency has been associated with symptoms including impaired social cognition, reduced empathy, insecure attachment, social anxiety, reduced trust, alexithymia, depression, and reduced psychosocial resilience, among others.

The entactogen MDMA is used both recreationally and in MDMA-assisted psychotherapy for treatment of conditions like post-traumatic stress disorder (PTSD). It robustly increases oxytocin levels, and this effect is thought to be involved in its entactogenic effects. In people with oxytocin deficiency due to arginine vasopressin deficiency, MDMA fails to elevate oxytocin levels and shows markedly blunted entactogenic effects, including diminished effects like euphoria, enhanced empathy, and reduced anxiety.

Knockout mice for oxytocin or the oxytocin receptor show characteristics including lactation impairment, greater anxiety-like behavior, social deficits, increased aggression, repetitive behaviors, obesity, and reduced bone formation and osteoporosis, among others. Similar behavioral changes have been found in socially isolated rodents, which show decreased oxytocin receptor levels and can be rescued by oxytocin receptor agonists. In addition, administration of oxytocin receptor antagonists can produce behavioral changes similar to those of social isolation.

== Causes ==
Oxytocin deficiency is known to occur in conditions of hypopituitarism such as arginine vasopressin deficiency (central diabetes insipidus), craniopharyngiomas, and others. It may also occur in congenital diseases such as Prader–Willi syndrome and Schaaf–Yang syndrome. There has been interest in whether oxytocin deficiency may occur and cause symptoms in autism as well.

== Diagnosis ==
No clinical test currently exists for diagnosis of oxytocin deficiency in routine practice. In addition, single-point oxytocin measurements are unreliable due to limitations such as poor specificity, high variability, and poor association with central oxytocin levels. Relatedly, oxytocin levels in the brain are 100- to 1,000-fold higher than those in the bloodstream.

Oxytocin-elevating interventions may be useful as a diagnostic provocation test for unmasking oxytocin deficiency. Certain drugs can robustly elevate oxytocin levels with a single dose under normal circumstances, for instance the entactogen MDMA (+500–800%) and estrogens like estradiol and ethinylestradiol (e.g., +100–400%). Controlled ovarian hyperstimulation can increase estradiol levels by around 90-fold and oxytocin levels by about 6.5-fold. MDMA fails to elevate oxytocin levels in people with arginine vasopressin deficiency in research settings. As such, it can be used to reliably diagnose oxytocin deficiency in people with this condition. However, routine clinical use of MDMA for oxytocin deficiency is limited by its psychoactive effects and controlled status, though lower doses or safer alternatives may be more feasible. Estrogens are being studied for potential diagnosis of oxytocin deficiency. Fenfluramine has been found in the past to more than double oxytocin levels. Serotonergic psychedelics like LSD, psilocybin, and mescaline also increase oxytocin levels, though of course are precluded by their hallucinogenic effects. In addition, they produce much smaller increases in oxytocin levels compared to MDMA.

Other drugs that more modestly elevate oxytocin levels (+20%) include melatonin, glucagon, and kisspeptin, but the increases have been deemed insufficient for diagnostic purposes among other limitations. Other relevant oxytocin-elevating provocation tests include insulin tolerance test (+100%), physical exercise or sexual self-stimulation (+50–200%), and psychosocial stress (+50–150%), but all have drawbacks such as side effects or potential variability and unreproducibility. Neurophysin I (NP-I), a stable stable carrier protein co-released with oxytocin, is a surrogate biomarker of oxytocin production, and has been found to be a more reliable and robust indicator of oxytocin production than oxytocin levels themselves. Oxytocin-elevating provocation and/or NP-1 surrogate tests may eventually lead to a routine clinical diagnostic test for oxytocin deficiency.

== Treatment ==
There is currently no treatment for oxytocin deficiency. However, there is interest in oxytocin substitution therapy in the treatment of the condition. A clinical trial of oxytocin nasal spray (Syntocinon) for oxytocin deficiency in people with arginine vasopressin deficiency (central diabetes insipidus) is underway as of May 2026. Other trials of oxytocin therapy for oxytocin deficiency are also underway.

Although intranasal oxytocin can produce measurable brain changes and associated prosocial effects, it has shown modest, mixed, and disappointing results in clinical trials for various indications such as treatment of autism among others. Relatedly, the drug is limited by pharmacokinetic problems such as very poor blood–brain barrier permeability (e.g., 0.002–0.005% of total dose) and a very short elimination half-life (3–5 minutes in plasma, 28 minutes in cerebrospinal fluid) related to its peptide nature. Another possible limitation of oxytocin receptor agonists is tolerance or tachyphylaxis, for instance due to oxytocin receptor desensitization or downregulation.

In addition to peptide oxytocin receptor agonists like oxytocin, small-molecule oxytocin receptor agonists like LIT-001 and LIT-002, which show greatly improved pharmacokinetic properties like central permeability and duration in comparison, are a potential future approach for oxytocin therapy that is under development. The same may be true of arachidonate 15-lipoxygenase (ALOX15) inhibitors such as KNX-100 (SOC-1), which increase central oxytocin production and have been found to indirectly produce robust oxytocin-like effects in animals.

== History ==
Oxytocin deficiency was first formally identified and documented by Mirjam Christ-Crain and colleagues in Basel, Switzerland in 2023. This was via an MDMA provocation test in people with arginine vasopressin deficiency (central diabetes insipidus), who failed to show the strong increases in circulating oxytocin levels and associated entactogenic effects that are seen following administration of MDMA in healthy volunteers. However, a much earlier study in 1983 also reported blunted oxytocin secretion in response to estrogen provocation in two males with the condition.
