= Polydipsia in birds =

Polydipsia is an excessively large water intake. Its occurrence in captive birds has been recorded, although it is a relatively rare abnormal behaviour.

== Causes ==
=== Toxins ===
Polydipsia can be the result of a bird having ingested a toxin, or overconsumption of natural substances. For example, in pet birds, crackers, snack items, chips, fast foods, and canned vegetables (unrinsed) if eaten in sufficient quantities may cause a mild salt toxicity (5-10 times requirement) and subsequent polydipsia. Polydipsia can result from zinc poisoning to which caged birds may be particularly susceptible because of the zinc coating often used on birdcage bars.

Polydipsia has been experimentally induced in pigeons, budgerigars and ducks, by the administration of lithium chloride (LiCl). The polydipsic effect was greatest in budgerigars, a desert-dwelling species with a well-developed fluid retention system, and least in ducks, a species with an efficient sodium-secretion system.

=== Symptom of disease ===
In waterfowl, polydipsia can be a symptom of duck virus enteritis. Polydipsia has also been listed as a symptom of many diseases, including

- Nephrogenic diabetes insipidus
- Diabetes insipidus
- Diabetes mellitus
- Renal glucosuria
- Vitamin A deficiency
- Liver disease
- Renal disease
- Hypercalcemia?
- Hyperthyroidism?
- Hyperadrenocorticism?
- Hypervitaminosis D3
- Elevated dietary sodium
- Excess dietary protein
- Excess fruit consumption

=== Brain lesions ===
In hens, lesions of the supraoptic hypothalamus of the brain can result in polydipsia.

=== Psychogenic ===
Polydipsia sometimes occurs under housing or experimental conditions which purportedly lead to stress or frustration.

Growing parent stock of meat-type chickens (broilers), subjected routinely to chronic food restriction, show increased drinking after a single daily meal along with other oral stereotypies. Expression of these activities is correlated positively with the level of restriction imposed, and is thought to be controlled mainly by central dopaminergic mechanisms.

Under experimental conditions where birds receive reinforcements on a strict schedule, for example receiving one pellet of food each minute often indicated by a tone or other stimulus, the birds may develop polydipsia. Under these conditions it is called schedule induced polydipsia or sometimes, adjunctive drinking.

== Genetics ==
Some strains of hens are polydipsic, drinking almost twice the normal amount of water. It has been suggested that a recessive major gene is involved in this condition. Similarly, a quail line that exhibits polyuria was found to be fixed for an autosomal recessive mutation that also induced polydipsia.
