= Polyuria =

Excess urination

- Other names: Urination - excessive amount
- Regulation of urine production by ADH and aldosterone
- Specialty: Endocrinology, nephrology
- Causes: Polydipsia, Psychogenic polydipsia
- Diagnostic method: Urine test and blood test
- Treatment: Depends on cause(See cause)

Polyuria (/ˌpɒliˈjʊəriə/) is excessive or an abnormally large production or passage of urine (greater than 2.5 L or 3 L over 24 hours in adults). Increased production and passage of urine may also be termed as diuresis. Polyuria often appears in conjunction with polydipsia (increased thirst), though it is possible to have one without the other, and the latter may be a cause or an effect. Primary polydipsia may lead to polyuria. Polyuria is usually viewed as a symptom or sign of another disorder (not a disease by itself), but it can be classed as a disorder, at least when its underlying causes are not clear.

== Causes ==
The most common cause of polyuria in both adults and children is uncontrolled diabetes mellitus, which causes osmotic diuresis; when glucose levels are so high that glucose is excreted in the urine. Water follows the glucose concentration passively, leading to abnormally high urine output.

In the absence of diabetes mellitus, the most common causes are the decreased secretion of aldosterone due to adrenal cortical tumor, primary polydipsia (excessive fluid drinking), central diabetes insipidus, and nephrogenic diabetes insipidus. Polyuria may also be due to various chemical substances, such as diuretics, caffeine, and ethanol. It may also occur after supraventricular tachycardias, during an onset of atrial fibrillation, childbirth, and the removal of an obstruction within the urinary tract. Diuresis is controlled by antidiuretics such as vasopressin, angiotensin II and aldosterone. Cold diuresis is the occurrence of increased urine production upon exposure to cold, which also partially explains immersion diuresis. High-altitude diuresis occurs at altitudes above 10,000 feet (3,000 m) and is a desirable indicator of adaptation to high altitudes. Mountaineers who are adapting well to high altitudes experience this type of diuresis. People who produce less urine even in the presence of adequate fluid intake are probably not adapting well to high altitudes.

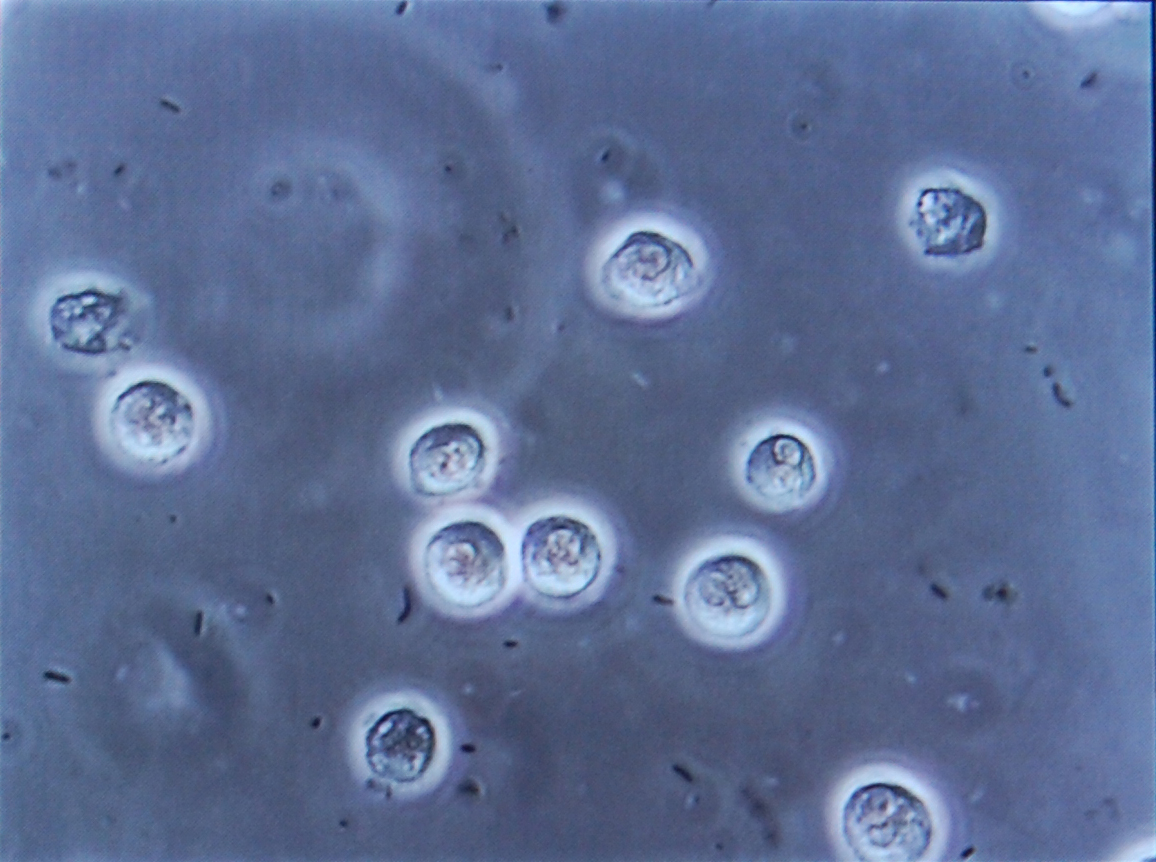
Urinary tract infection (bacteria are black and bean-shaped)

=== List of causes ===
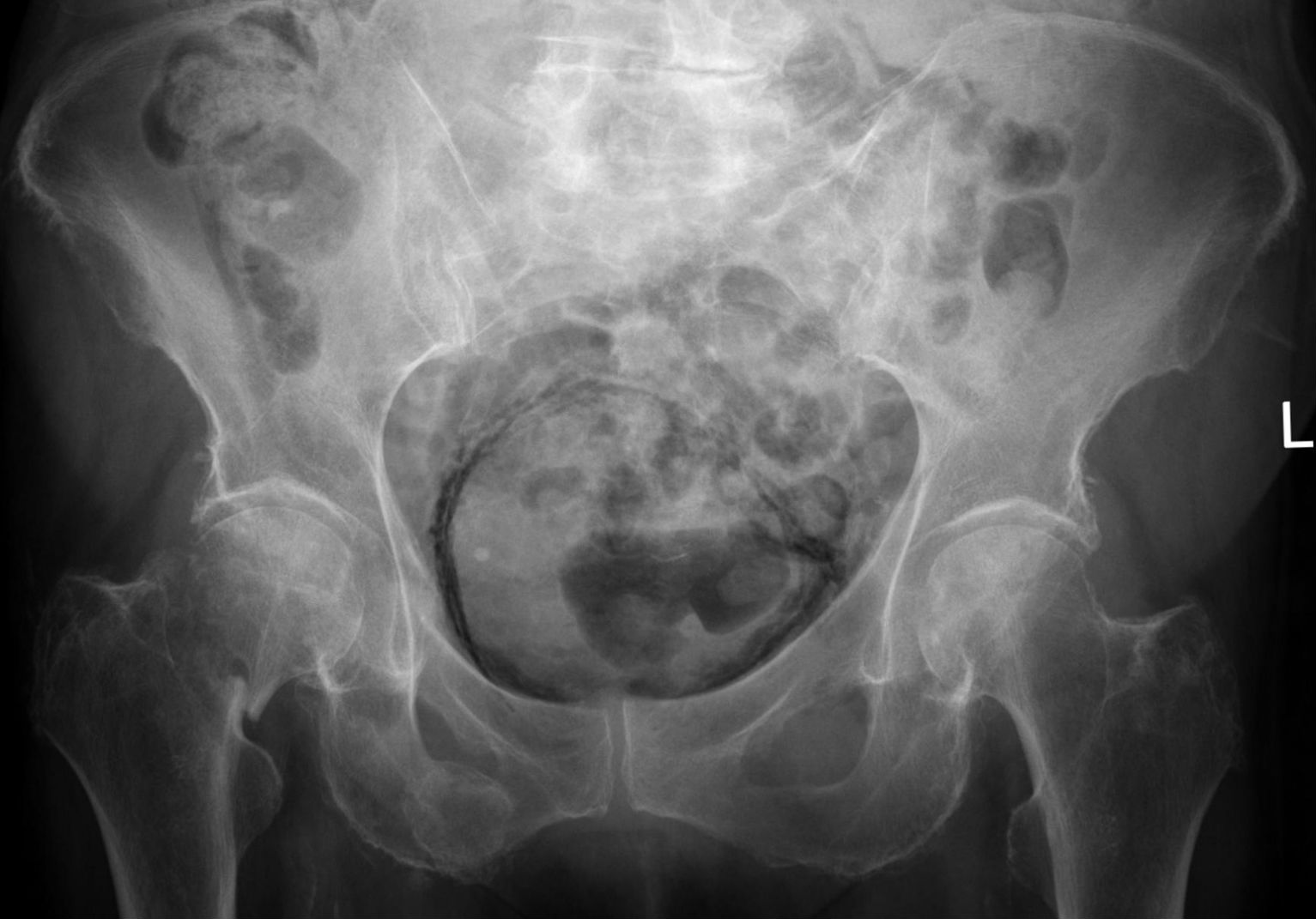
Emphysematous cystitis

Lithium-carbonate

General
- polydipsia
- psychogenic polydipsia
- diuretic drugs, osmotic diuresis

Urinary system

- interstitial cystitis
- urinary tract infection
- renal tubular acidosis
- Fanconi syndrome
- nephronophthisis (genetic)

Hormonal

- hypokalemia
- diabetes mellitus
- corticosteroid use
- pheochromocytoma
- hyperparathyroidism
- diabetes insipidus
- hypercalcaemia
- hyperthyroidism
- hypopituitarism
- Conn's disease
- hyperglycaemia

Circulation

- congestive heart failure
- cardiorespiratory disease
- postural orthostatic tachycardia syndrome (POTS)

Neurologic

- cerebral salt-wasting syndrome
- neurologic damage
- migraine

Other

- high doses of riboflavin (vitamin B_{2})
- high doses of vitamin D
- altitude diuresis
- side effect of lithium
- hemochromatosis
- ochratoxicosis

== Mechanism ==
Polyuria, in osmotic cases, increases flow amount in the distal nephron where flow rates and velocity are low. The significant pressure increase occurring in the distal nephron takes place particularly in the cortical-collecting ducts. One study from 2008 laid out a hypothesis that hyperglycaemic and osmotic polyuria play roles ultimately in diabetic nephropathy.

== Diagnosis ==
Among the possible tests to diagnose polyuria are:

- Urine test
- FBC
- Blood test
- Pituitary function test

== Treatment ==
Depending on the cause of the polyuria, the adequate treatment should be afforded. According to NICE, desmopressin can be considered for nocturnal polyuria, which can be caused by diabetes mellitus, if other medical treatments have failed. The recommendation had no studies that met the criteria for consideration.

== See also ==
- Oliguria
- Diabetes insipidus
- Diabetes mellitus
- Polydipsia
