= Antidiuretic =

Agents that reduce the excretion of urine, most notably the octapeptide vasopressins

An antidiuretic is a substance that helps to control fluid balance in an animal's body by reducing urination, opposing diuresis. Its effects are opposite that of a diuretic. The major endogenous antidiuretics are antidiuretic hormone (ADH; also called vasopressin) and oxytocin. Antidiuretic hormones are present in high concentrations under conditions of dehydration as a pathophysiological mechanism to promote water reabsorption. Both of those are also used exogenously as medications in people whose bodies need extra help with fluid balance via suppression of diuresis. In addition, there are various other antidiuretic drugs, some molecularly close to ADH or oxytocin and others not. Antidiuretics reduce urine volume, particularly in diabetes insipidus (DI), which is one of their main indications.

The antidiuretic hormone class includes vasopressin (ADH), argipressin, desmopressin, lypressin, ornipressin, oxytocin, and terlipressin. Miscellaneous others include chlorpropamide and carbamazepine.

== See also ==
- Diuretic
- Electrolyte
- Water-electrolyte imbalance
