= Salt poisoning =

Intoxication from excessive intake of sodium

- Other names: Sodium poisoning
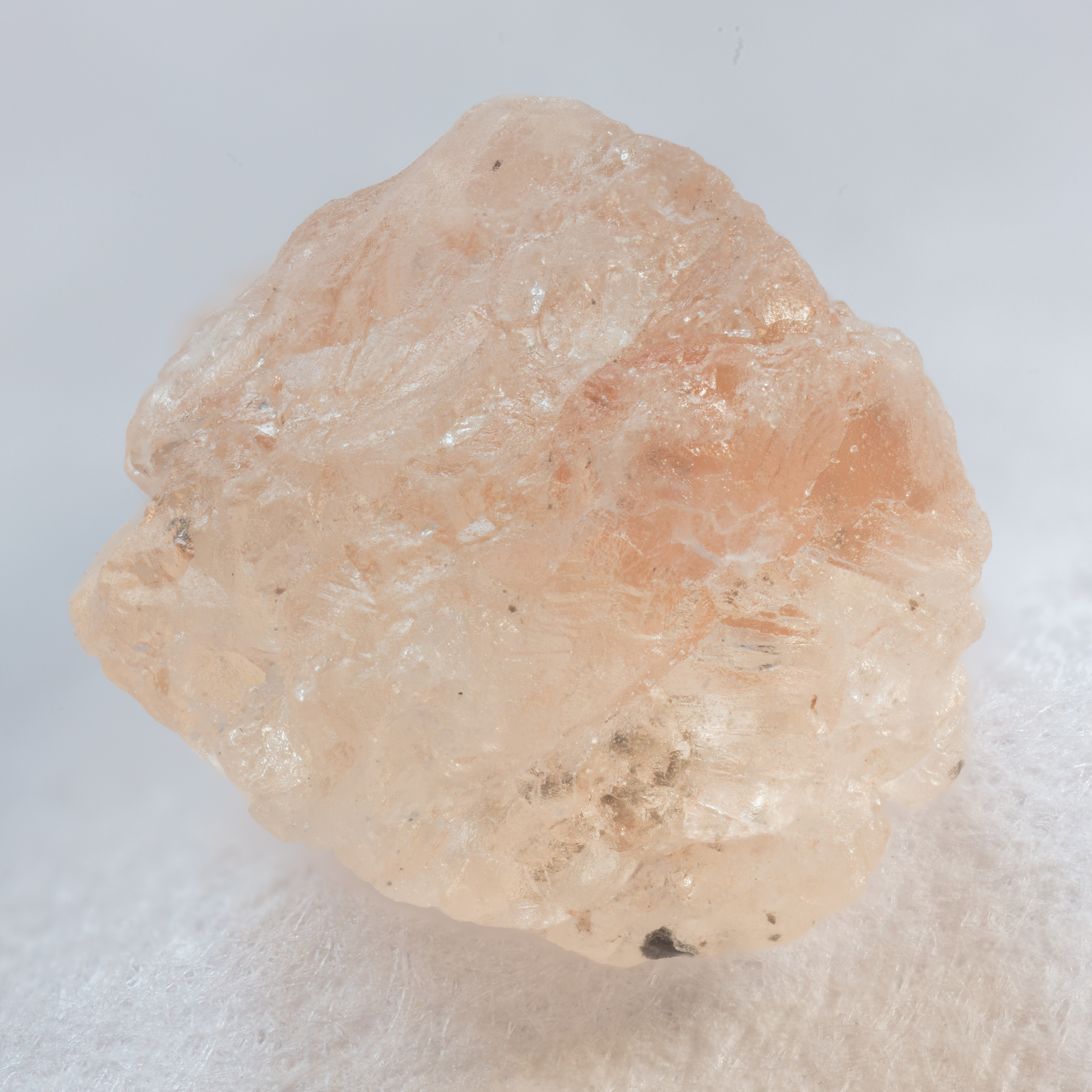
- High resolution image of a grain of sea salt. Sea salt is one of the most common causes of sodium poisoning.

Salt poisoning is an intoxication resulting from the excessive intake of sodium (usually as sodium chloride) either in solid form or in solution (saline water, including brine, brackish water, or seawater). Salt poisoning sufficient to produce severe symptoms is rare, and lethal salt poisoning is possible but even rarer. The lethal dose of table salt is roughly 0.5–1 gram per kilogram of body weight.

In medicine, salt poisoning is most frequently encountered in children or infants who may be made to consume excessive amounts of table salt. At least one instance of murder of a hospitalized child by salt poisoning has been reported.

Adults can consume too much salt by consuming seawater, pickled goods, brine water, or soy sauce. Salt poisoning has been seen in a number of adults with mental health problems.

Salt poisoning can affect most species of animals, although it is more common in swine, cattle, and poultry.

== Symptoms and physiology ==
Salt poisoning typically results in a feeling of confusion and jitteriness; more severe intoxication can cause seizures and coma. Death can result if medical intervention is not forthcoming. These symptoms are generally a consequence of hypernatremia – an abnormally high sodium level in the blood. (There are myriad causes of hypernatremia, which is frequently encountered in medical practice; salt poisoning is not a common cause).

Early on, the intoxicant will cause a strong feeling of thirst, followed by weakness, nausea, and loss of appetite. More severe symptoms ensue, including confusion, muscle twitching, and bleeding in or around the brain. Death results by the swelling of the brain against the skull. (Normal serum sodium levels are 135–145 mEq/liter (135–145 mmol/L). Severe symptoms typically only occur when levels are above 160 mEq/L.) The human renal system actively regulates sodium chloride in the blood within a very narrow range around 9 g/L (0.9% by weight).

In most open waters concentrations vary somewhat around typical values of about 3.5%; drinking seawater temporarily increases blood's NaCl concentration, which signals the kidney to excrete sodium. However, seawater's sodium concentration is above the kidney's maximum concentrating ability. Eventually the blood's sodium concentration rises to toxic levels, removing water from cells and interfering with nerve conduction, ultimately producing a fatal seizure and cardiac arrhythmia.

== Sea water poisoning ==
Survival manuals consistently advise against drinking seawater. A summary of 163 life raft voyages estimated the risk of death at 39% for those who drank seawater, compared to 3% for those who did not. The effect of seawater intake on rats confirmed the negative effects of drinking seawater when dehydrated. (In contrast to humans, pelagic birds and other sea animals can – and must – drink sea water without ill effects, having evolved for life at sea over the course of eons.)

Accidentally consuming small quantities of clean seawater is not harmful, especially if the seawater is taken along with a larger quantity of fresh water. However, drinking seawater to maintain hydration is counterproductive; more water must be excreted to eliminate the salt (via urine) than the amount of water obtained from the seawater itself.

=== Historical experiences ===
In The Odyssey, when faced with the prospect of starvation, the sailors take into consideration drinking salt water "and be done with it".

Some historians have suggested that the mysterious sicknesses afflicting the early English colonists at Jamestown, Virginia (1607–1610) – which nearly extinguished the settlement – reflect sea water poisoning. The settlers arrived in the spring, when the James River water was relatively fresh, but by summer a drought of historical magnitude had rendered it much more brackish. The historical geographer Carville Earle, among others, holds to this view.

The temptation to drink seawater was greatest for sailors who had expended their supply of fresh water, and were unable to capture enough rainwater for drinking. This frustration was described by a line from Samuel Taylor Coleridge's epic poem The Rime of the Ancient Mariner (1798):

"Water, water, everywhere,
And all the boards did shrink;
Water, water, everywhere,
Nor any drop to drink."

== See also ==
- Salt water aspiration syndrome – a medical condition caused by the inhalation or aspiration of small amounts of salt water.
- Hypernatremia – high sodium levels in blood.
