= Provocation test =

A provocation test, also called a provocation trial or provocation study, is a form of medical clinical trial whereby participants are exposed to either a substance or "thing" that is claimed to provoke a response, or to a sham substance or device that should provoke no response, or a severe exercise as in Erb's test for low serum calcium . An example of a provocation test, performed on an individual, is a skin allergy test.

== See also ==
- Blind experiment
- Control group
