= Primary polydipsia =

- Other names: Psychogenic polydipsia, compulsive drinking, psychosis-intermittent hyponatremia-polydipsia (PIP) syndrome
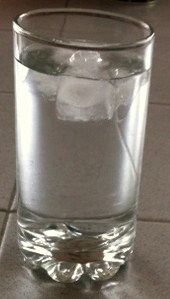
- Patients with PPD often prefer ice cold water
- Specialty: Psychiatry
- Symptoms: Xerostomia, polydipsia, fluid-seeking behavior
- Complications: Water intoxication
- Differential diagnosis: Diabetes insipidus (central, nephrogenic), Diabetes mellitus

Primary polydipsia and psychogenic polydipsia are forms of polydipsia characterised by excessive fluid intake in the absence of physiological stimuli to drink. Psychogenic polydipsia caused by psychiatric disorders—oftentimes schizophrenia—is frequently accompanied by the sensation of dry mouth. Some conditions with polydipsia as a symptom are non-psychogenic (e.g., early Type 2 diabetes, primary hyperaldosteronism, and zinc deficiency, and some forms of diabetes insipidus). Primary polydipsia is a diagnosis of exclusion.

== Signs and symptoms ==
Signs and symptoms of psychogenic polydipsia include:

- Excessive thirst and xerostomia, leading to overconsumption of water
- Hyponatraemia, causing headache, muscular weakness, twitching, confusion, vomiting, irritability etc., although this is only seen in 20–30% of cases.
- Hypervolemia, leading to oedema, hypertension and weight gain (due to the kidneys being unable to filter the excess blood) in extreme episodes
- Tonic-clonic seizure
- Behavioural changes, including fluid-seeking behaviour; patients have been known to seek fluids from any available source, such as toilets and shower rooms.

The most common presenting symptom is tonic-clonic seizure, found in 80% of patients. Psychogenic polydipsia should be considered a life-threatening condition, since it has been known to cause severe hyponatraemia, leading to cardiac arrest, coma and cerebral oedema.

== Brain differences ==
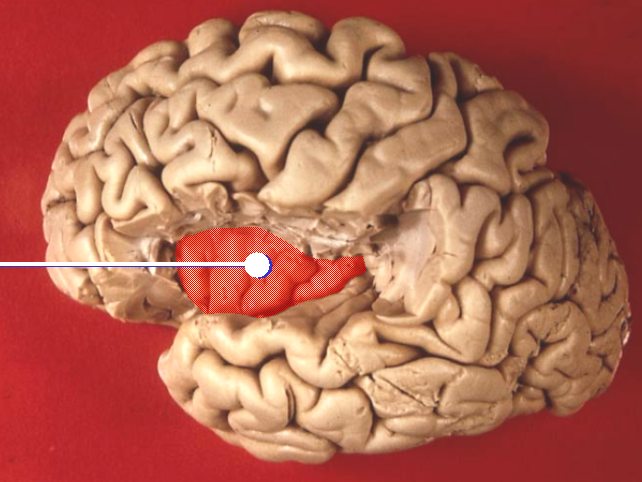
Location of the insular cortex, a structure implicated in PPD

Psychogenic polydipsia in individuals with schizophrenia is associated with differences seen in neuroimaging. MRI scans may be used to help with differentiating between PPD and diabetes insipidus, such as by examining the signal of the posterior pituitary (weakened or absent in central DI). Some patients, most often with a history of mental illness, show a shrunken cortex and enlarged ventricles on an MRI scan, which makes differentiation between psychogenic and physiological cause difficult. However, these changes will likely only develop after chronic PPD associated with severe mental illness, as opposed to less severe forms of the disorder as seen in those with anxiety and affective disorders. PPD is also linked with significant reductions in insular cortex volume, although this may be caused by the secondary hyponatraemia. It has been suggested that these deficits lead to moderate to severe cognitive impairments, especially affecting working memory, verbal memory, executive function, attention and motor speed.

Other areas with volume reductions (both white and grey matter) include:

- Right posterior lobe
- Right inferior temporal gyrus
- Parahippocampal gyrus
- Both left and right superior temporal gyri
- Right cuneus
- Left medial frontal gyryus and inferior frontal gyrus
- Right lingual gyrus

== Diagnosis ==
As a diagnosis of exclusion, a diagnosis of primary polydipsia may be the result of elimination of the possibility of diseases causing similar signs and symptoms, such as diabetes insipidus.

Diagnosis may be complicated by the fact that chronic and extreme compulsive drinking may impair the response of the kidneys to vasopressin, thus reducing the kidney's ability to concentrate the urine. This means that psychogenic polydipsia may lead to test results (e.g. in a water restriction test) consistent with diabetes insipidus or SIADH, leading to misdiagnosis.

Dry mouth is often a side effect of medications used in the treatment of some mental disorders, rather than being caused by the underlying condition. Such medications include antipsychotics, antidepressants, anticonvulsants, alpha agonists and anticholinergics. It should also be ensured that the thirst isn't caused by diuretic use (particularly thiazide diuretics), MDMA use, excessive solute intake or chronic alcoholism. Alcoholism may cause physiological thirst since ethanol inhibits vasopressin, the hormone primarily responsible for water retention in osmoregulation. The following conditions should also be excluded: DI, cerebral salt wasting, pseudohyponatraemia caused by hyperlipidemia or hyperparaproteinemia, SIADH, mineralcorticoid deficiency, salt-wasting nephropathy, nephrotic syndrome, chronic heart failure and cirrhosis.

Tobacco smoking is an often overlooked factor linked to hyponatremia, due to the ADH-releasing effect of nicotine, although this is usually limited to heavy smokers. One study suggested that around 70% of patients with self-induced polydipsia were tobacco smokers. Diagnostic tests for primary polydipsia usually involves the fluid deprivation test to exclude ADH problems. The desmopressin test is also used, in which the synthetic hormone is used as a diagnostic workup to test for inappropriate secretion of vasopressin, as seen in DI and SIADH.

=== Patient profiles ===
Psychogenic polydipsia is found in patients with mental illnesses, most commonly schizophrenia, but also anxiety disorders and rarely affective disorders, anorexia nervosa and personality disorders. PPD occurs in between 6% and 20% of psychiatric inpatients. It may also be found in people with developmental disorders, such as those with autism. While psychogenic polydipsia is usually not seen outside the population of those with serious mental disorders, it may occasionally be found among others in the absence of psychosis, although there is no existent research to document this other than anecdotal observations. Such persons typically prefer to possess bottled water that is ice-cold, consume water and other fluids at excessive levels. However, a preference for ice-cold water is also seen in diabetes insipidus.

== Treatment ==
Estimation of serum sodium levels from weight gain and suggested interventions
Weight gained (% body mass)	Estimated serum sodium (mmol/L)	Suggested intervention
0–3	140–134	No direct intervention, monitoring
3–5	133–130	Redirection from water sources
5–7	129–126	Oral NaCl and redirection
7–10	125–120	Oral NaCl and redirection, possibly restraint
> 10	< 120	Slow IV saline, seizure precautions

Treatment for psychogenic polydipsia depends on severity and may involve behavioural and pharmacological modalities.

=== Acute hyponatraemia ===
If the patient presents with acute hyponatraemia (low sodium levels due to overhydration) caused by psychogenic polydipsia, treatment usually involves administration of intravenous hypertonic (3%) saline until the serum sodium levels stabilise to within a normal range, even if the patient becomes asymptomatic.

=== Fluid restriction ===
If the patient is institutionalised, monitoring of behaviour and serum sodium levels is necessary. In treatment-resistant polydipsic psychiatric patients, regulation in the inpatient setting can be accomplished by use of a weight-water protocol. First, base-line weights must be established and correlated to serum sodium levels. Weight will normally fluctuate during the day, but as the water intake of the polydipsic goes up, the weight will naturally rise. The physician can order a stepped series of interventions as the weight rises. The correlation must be individualized with attention paid to the patient's normal weight and fluctuations, diet, comorbid disorders (such as a seizure disorder) and urinary system functioning. Progressive steps might include redirection, room restriction, and increasing levels of physical restraint with monitoring. Such plans should also include progressive increases in monitoring, as well as a level at which a serum sodium level is drawn.

=== Behavioural ===
Behavioural treatments may involve the use of a token economy to provide positive reinforcement to desirable behaviour. Furthermore, cognitive therapy techniques can be used to address the thought patterns that lead to compulsive drinking behaviour. Success has been seen in trials of this technique, with emphasis on the development of coping techniques (e.g. taking small sips of water, having ice cubes instead of drinks) in addition to challenging delusions leading to excessive drinking.

Psychogenic polydipsia often leads to institutionalisation of mentally ill patients, since it is difficult to manage in the community. Most studies of behavioural treatments occur in institutional settings and require close monitoring of the patient and a large degree of time commitment from staff.

=== Pharmaceutical ===
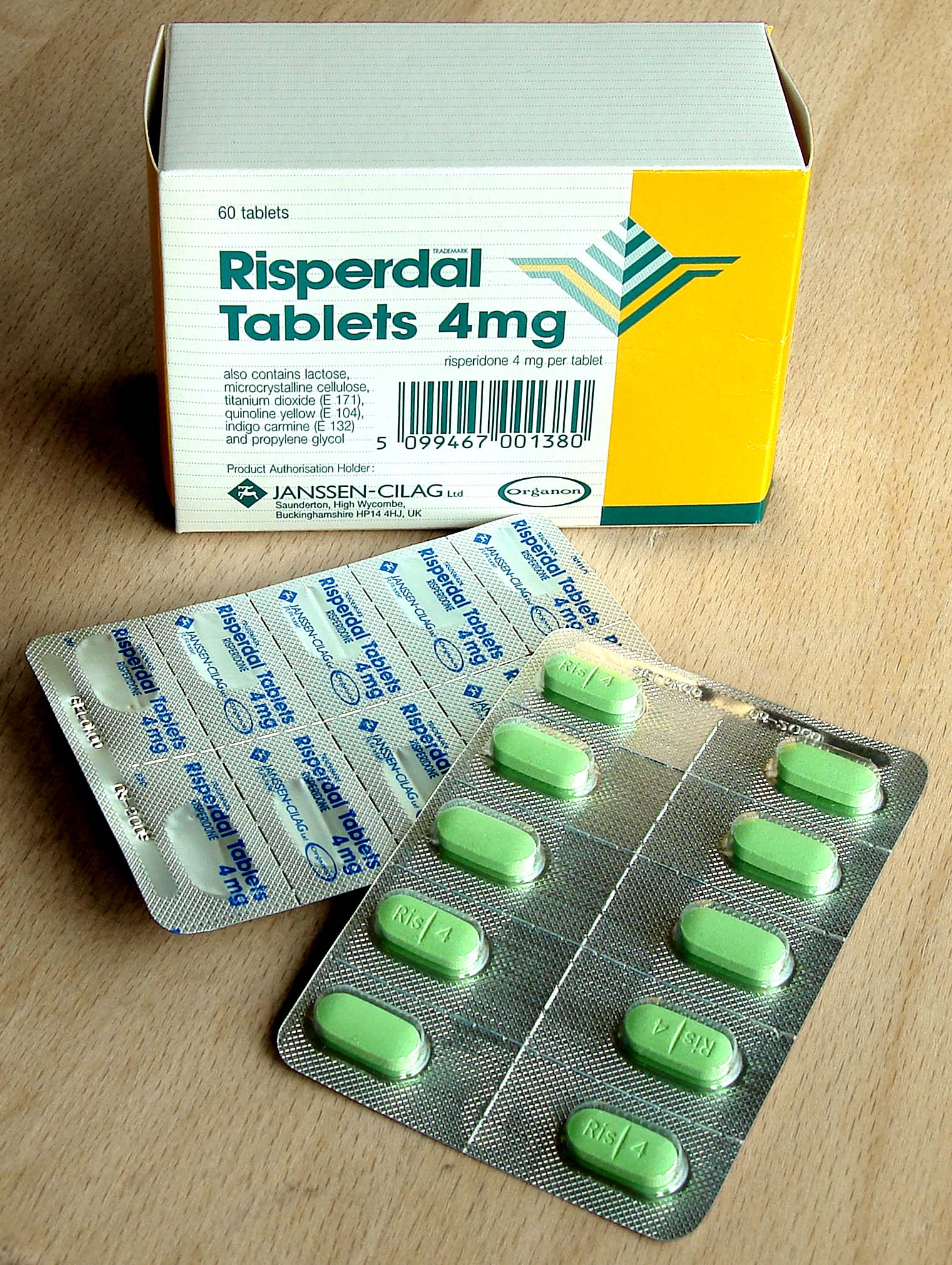
Risperdal (risperidone) tablets

A number of pharmaceuticals may be used in an attempt to bring the polydipsia under control, including:

- Atypical antipsychotics, such as clozapine, olanzapine and risperidone
- Demeclocycline, a tetracycline antibiotic, which is effective due to the side effect of inducing nephrogenic diabetes insipidus. Demeclocycline is used for cases of psychogenic polydipsia, including those with nocturnal enuresis (bed-wetting). Its mechanism of action involves direct inhibition of vasopressin at the DCTs, thus reducing urine concentration.

There are a number of emerging pharmaceutical treatments for psychogenic polydipsia, although these need further investigation:

- ACE Inhibitors, such as enalapril
- Clonidine, an alpha-2 adrenergic agonist
- Irbesartan, an angiotensin II receptor antagonist
- Propranolol, a sympatholytic beta blocker
- Vasopressin receptor antagonists, such as conivaptan
- Acetazolamide, a carbonic anhydrase inhibitor

Lithium was previously used for treatment of PPD as a direct competitive ADH antagonist, but is now generally avoided due to its toxic effects on the thyroid and kidneys.

The majority of psychotropic drugs (and a good many of other classes) can cause dry mouth as a side effect, but this is not to be confused with true polydipsia in which a dangerous drop in serum sodium will be seen.

== Terminology ==
In diagnosis, primary polydipsia is usually categorised as:

- Psychogenic (PPD) – caused by underlying psychiatric symptoms, including those caused by psychoses and rarely by affective disorders
- Non-psychogenic – another non-psychological cause, including idiopathic (unknown cause)

The terms primary polydipsia and psychogenic polydipsia are sometimes incorrectly used interchangeably – to be considered psychogenic, the patient needs to have some other psychiatric symptoms, such as delusions involving fluid intake or other unusual behaviours. Primary polydipsia may have physiological causes, such as autoimmune hepatitis.

Since primary polydipsia is a diagnosis of exclusion, the diagnosis may be made for patients who have medically unexplained excessive thirst, and this is sometimes incorrectly referred to as psychogenic rather than primary polydipsia.

== Non-psychogenic ==
Although primary polydipsia is usually categorised as psychogenic, there are some rare non-psychogenic causes. An example is polydipsia found in patients with autoimmune chronic hepatitis with severely elevated globulin levels. Evidence for the thirst being non-psychogenic is gained from the fact that it disappears after treatment of the underlying disease.

== Non-human animals ==
Psychogenic polydipsia is also observed in some non-human patients, such as in rats and cats.

== See also ==
- Water intoxication
- Fluid deprivation test
