= Dehydration =

Deficit of total body water

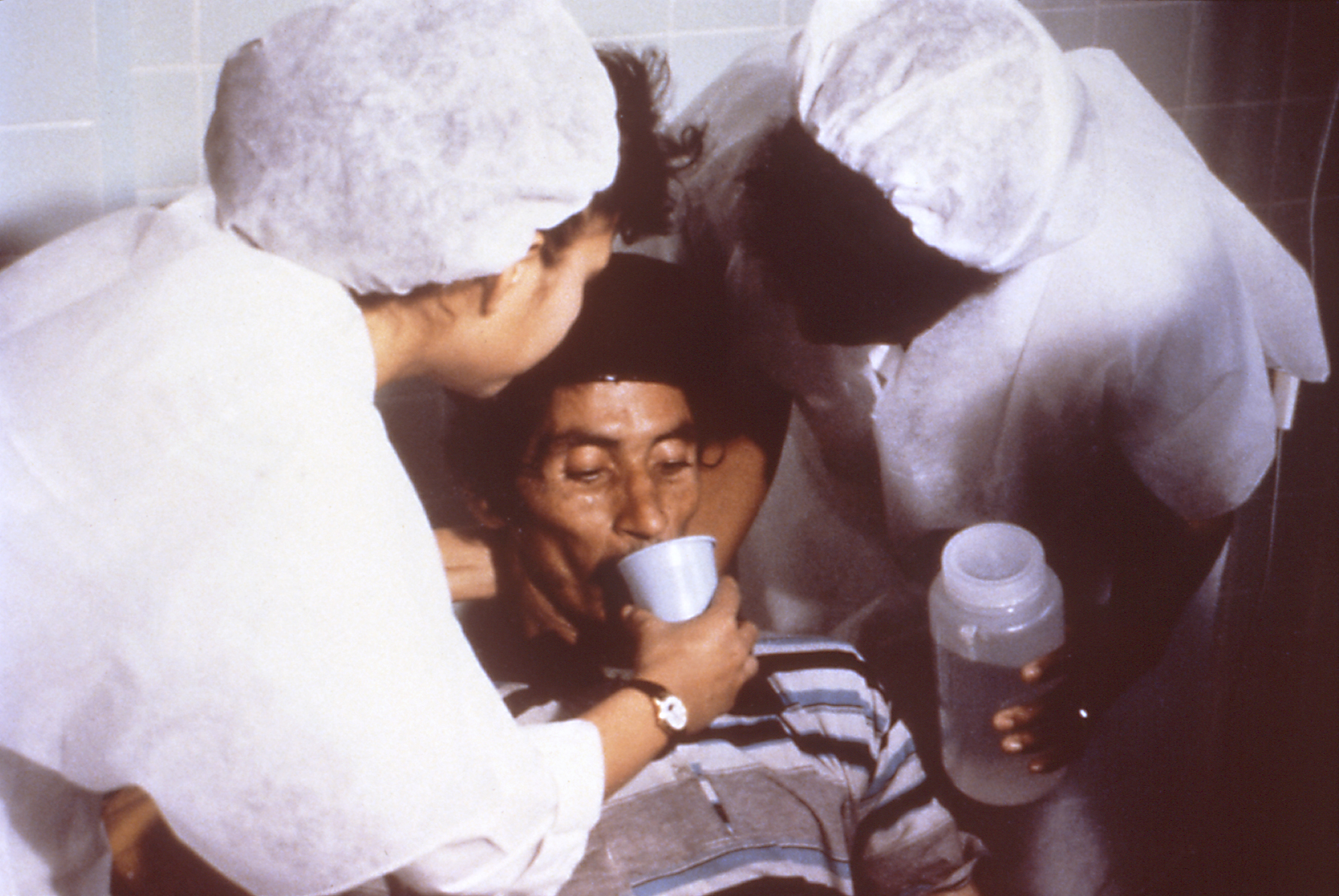
- Nurses encourage a patient to drink an oral rehydration solution to treat dehydration caused by cholera.
- Specialty: Critical care medicine
- Symptoms: Increased thirst, tiredness, decreased urine, dizziness, headaches, and confusion
- Complications: Low blood volume shock (hypovolemic shock), coma, seizures, urinary tract infection, kidney disease, heatstroke, hypernatremia, metabolic disease, hypertension
- Causes: Loss of body water
- Risk factors: Physical water scarcity, heatwaves, disease (most commonly from diseases that cause vomiting and/or diarrhea), exercise
- Treatment: Drinking clean water
- Medication: Saline

In physiology, dehydration is a lack of total body water that disrupts metabolic processes. It occurs when free water loss exceeds intake, often resulting from excessive sweating, health conditions, or inadequate consumption of water. Mild dehydration can also be caused by immersion diuresis, which may increase risk of decompression sickness in divers.

Most people can tolerate a 3–4% decrease in total body water without difficulty or adverse health effects. A 5–8% decrease can cause fatigue and dizziness. Loss of over 10% of total body water can cause physical and mental deterioration, accompanied by severe thirst. Death occurs with a 15 to 25% loss of body water. Mild dehydration usually resolves with oral rehydration, but severe cases may need intravenous fluids.

Dehydration can cause hypernatremia (high levels of sodium ions in the blood). This is distinct from hypovolemia (loss of blood volume, particularly blood plasma).

Chronic dehydration can cause kidney stones as well as the development of chronic kidney disease.

== Signs and symptoms ==
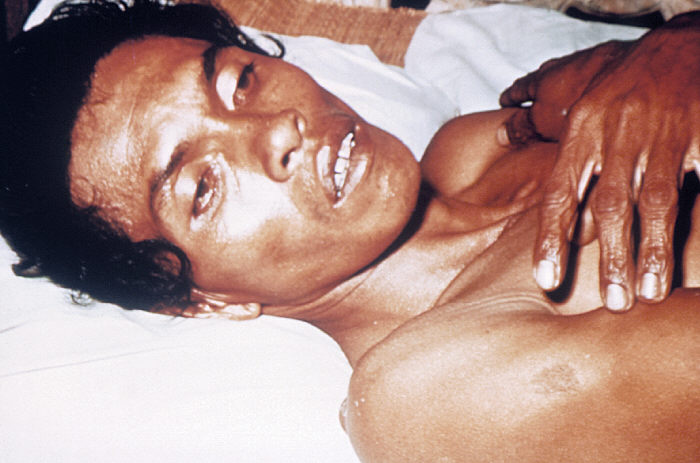
A person with severe dehydration due to cholera, causing sunken eyes and wrinkled hands and skin

The hallmarks of dehydration include thirst and neurological changes such as headaches, general discomfort, loss of appetite, nausea, decreased urine volume (unless polyuria is the cause of dehydration), confusion, unexplained tiredness, purple fingernails, and seizures. The symptoms of dehydration become increasingly severe with greater total body water loss. A body water loss of 1–2%, considered mild dehydration, is shown to impair cognitive performance. While in people over age 50, the body's thirst sensation diminishes with age, a study found that there was no difference in fluid intake between young and old people. Many older people have symptoms of dehydration, with the most common being fatigue. Dehydration contributes to morbidity in the elderly population, especially during conditions that promote insensible free water losses, such as hot weather.

== Cause ==
Risk factors for dehydration include but are not limited to: exerting oneself in hot and humid weather, habitation at high altitudes, endurance athletics, elderly adults, infants, children and people living with chronic illnesses.

Dehydration can also come as a side effect from many different types of drugs and medications.

In the elderly, blunted response to thirst or inadequate ability to access free water in the face of excess free water losses (especially hyperglycemia related) seem to be the main causes of dehydration. Excess free water or hypotonic water can leave the body in two ways – sensible loss such as osmotic diuresis, sweating, vomiting and diarrhea, and insensible water loss, occurring mainly through the skin and respiratory tract. In humans, dehydration can be caused by a wide range of diseases and states that impair water homeostasis in the body. These occur primarily through either impaired thirst/water access or sodium excess.

== Mechanism ==
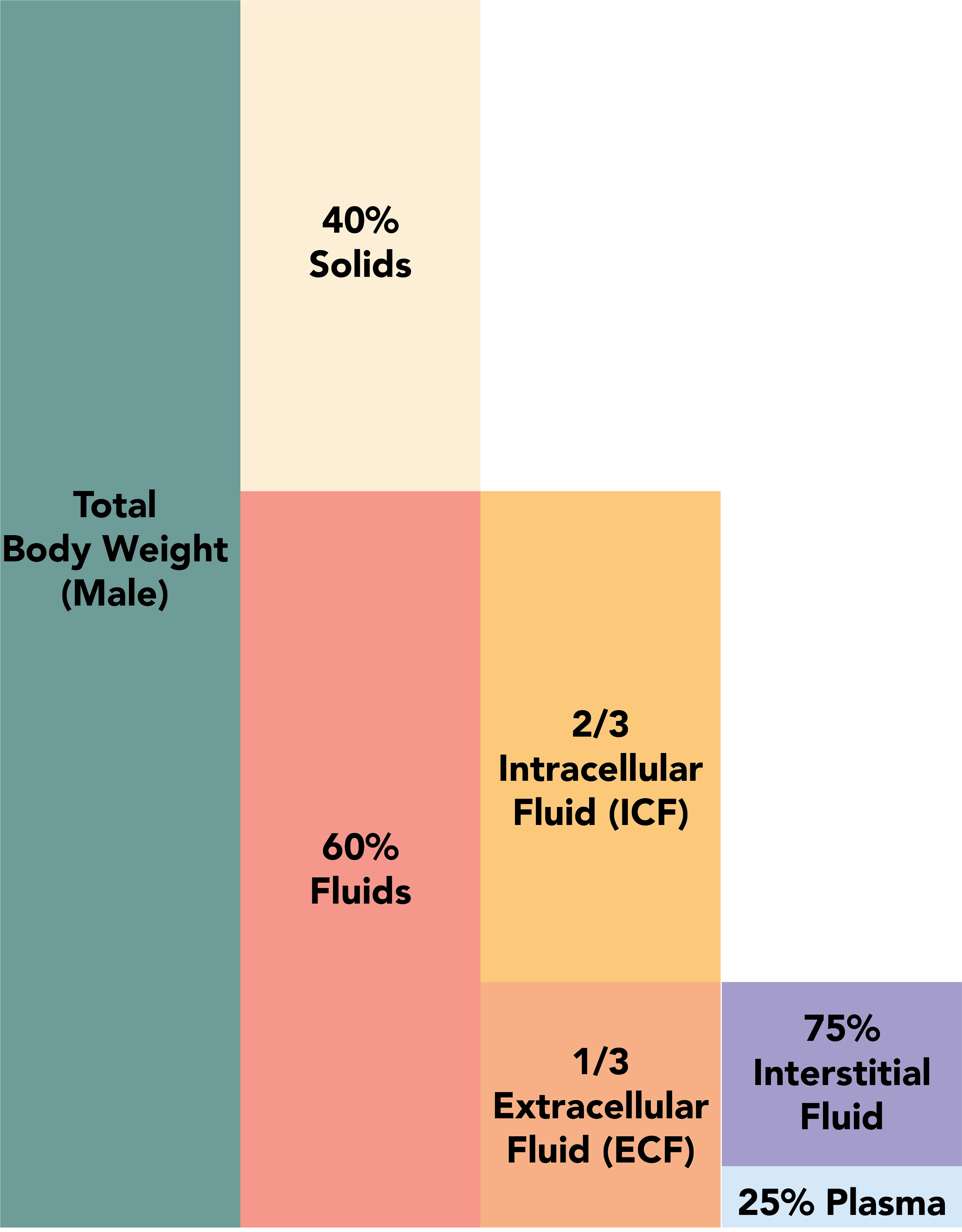
Diagram depicting the distribution of total body water into percentages of intracellular and extracellular fluid.

Water content of a human body varies from 70–75% in newborns to 40% and less in obese adults, an average value of 60% is suggested. Within the body, water is classified as intracellular fluid or extracellular fluid. Intracellular fluid refers to water that is contained within the cells. This consists of approximately 57% of the total body water weight. Fluid inside the cells has high concentrations of potassium, magnesium, phosphate, and proteins. Extracellular fluid consists of all fluid outside of the cells, and it includes blood and interstitial fluid. This makes up approximately 43% of the total body water weight. The most common ions in extracellular fluid include sodium, chloride, and bicarbonate.

The concentration of dissolved molecules and ions in the fluid is described as osmolarity and is measured in osmoles per liter (Osm/L). When the body experiences a free water deficit, the concentration of solutes is increased. This leads to a higher serum osmolarity. When serum osmolarity is elevated, this is detected by osmoreceptors in the hypothalamus. These receptors trigger the release of antidiuretic hormone (ADH). ADH resists dehydration by increasing water absorption in the kidneys and constricting blood vessels. It acts on the V2 receptors in the cells of the collecting tubule of the nephron to increase expression of aquaporin. In more extreme cases of low blood pressure, the hypothalamus releases higher amounts of ADH which also acts on V1 receptors. These receptors cause contractions in the peripheral vascular smooth muscle. This increases systemic vascular resistance and raises blood pressure.

== Diagnosis ==
=== Definition ===
Dehydration occurs when water intake does not replace free water lost due to normal physiologic processes, including breathing, urination, perspiration, or other causes, including diarrhea, and vomiting. Dehydration can be life-threatening when severe and lead to seizures or respiratory arrest, and also carries the risk of osmotic cerebral edema if rehydration is overly rapid.

The term "dehydration" has sometimes been used incorrectly as a proxy for the separate, related condition of hypovolemia, which specifically refers to a decrease in volume of blood plasma. The two are regulated through independent mechanisms in humans; the distinction is important in guiding treatment.

=== Physical examination ===
Ultrasound of the blood vessels of the neck that supports the diagnosis of severe dehydration

Common exam findings of dehydration include dry mucous membranes, dry axillae, increased capillary refill time, sunken eyes, and poor skin turgor. More extreme cases of dehydration can lead to orthostatic hypotension, dizziness, weakness, and altered mental status. Depending on the underlying cause of dehydration, other symptoms may be present as well. Excessive sweating from exercise may be associated with muscle cramps. Patients with gastrointestinal water loss from vomiting or diarrhea may also have fever or other systemic signs of infection.

The skin turgor test can be used to support the diagnosis of dehydration. The skin turgor test is conducted by pinching skin on the patient's body, in a location such as the forearm or the back of the hand, and watching to see how quickly it returns to its normal position. The skin turgor test can be unreliable in patients who have reduced skin elasticity, such as the elderly.

=== Laboratory tests ===
While there is no single gold standard test to diagnose dehydration, evidence can be seen in multiple laboratory tests involving blood and urine. Serum osmolarity above 295 mOsm/kg is typically seen in dehydration due to free water loss. A urinalysis, which is a test that performs chemical and microscopic analysis of urine, may find darker color or foul odor with severe dehydration. Urinary sodium also provides information about the type of dehydration. For hyponatremic dehydration, such as from vomiting or diarrhea, urinary sodium will be less than 10 mmol/L due to increased sodium retention by the kidneys in an effort to conserve water. In dehydrated patients with sodium loss due to diuretics or renal dysfunction, urinary sodium may be elevated above 20 mmol/L. Patients may also have elevated serum levels of blood urea nitrogen (BUN) and creatinine. Both of these molecules are normally excreted by the kidney, but when the circulating blood volume is low, the kidney can become injured. This causes decreased kidney function and results in elevated BUN and creatinine in the serum.

== Prevention ==
For routine activities, thirst is normally an adequate guide to maintain proper hydration. Minimum water intake will vary individually depending on weight, energy expenditure, age, sex, physical activity, environment, diet, and genetics. With exercise, exposure to hot environments, or a decreased thirst response, additional water may be required. In athletes in competition, drinking to thirst optimizes performance and safety, despite weight loss, and as of 2010, there was no scientific study showing that it is beneficial to stay ahead of thirst and maintain weight during exercise.

In warm or humid weather, or during heavy exertion, water loss can increase markedly, because humans have a large and widely variable capacity for sweating. Whole-body sweat losses in men can exceed 2 L/h during competitive sport, with rates of 3–4 L/h observed during short-duration, high-intensity exercise in the heat. When such large amounts of water are being lost through perspiration, electrolytes, especially sodium, are also being lost.

In most athletes exercising and sweating for 4–5 hours with a sweat sodium concentration of less than 50 mmol/L, the total sodium lost is less than 10% of total body stores (total stores are approximately 2,500 mmol, or 58 g for a 70-kg person). These losses appear to be well tolerated by most people. The inclusion of sodium in fluid replacement drinks has some theoretical benefits and poses little or no risk, so long as these fluids are hypotonic (since the mainstay of dehydration prevention is the replacement of free water losses).

== Treatment ==
The most effective treatment for minor dehydration is widely considered to be drinking water and reducing fluid loss. Plain water restores only the volume of the blood plasma, inhibiting the thirst mechanism before solute levels can be replenished. Consumption of solid foods can also contribute to hydration. It is estimated approximately 22% of American water intake comes from food. Urine concentration and frequency will return to normal as dehydration resolves.

In some cases, correction of a dehydrated state is accomplished by the replenishment of necessary water and electrolytes (through oral rehydration therapy, or fluid replacement by intravenous therapy). As oral rehydration is less painful, non-invasive, inexpensive, and easier to provide, it is the treatment of choice for mild dehydration. Solutions used for intravenous rehydration may be isotonic, hypertonic, or hypotonic depending on the cause of dehydration as well as the sodium concentration in the blood. Pure water injected into the veins will cause the breakdown (lysis) of red blood cells (erythrocytes).

When fresh water is unavailable (e.g. at sea or in a desert), seawater or drinks with significant alcohol concentration will worsen dehydration. Urine contains a lower solute concentration than seawater; this requires the kidneys to create more urine to remove the excess salt, causing more water to be lost than was consumed from seawater.

For severe cases of dehydration where fainting, unconsciousness, or other severely inhibiting symptoms are present (the patient is incapable of standing upright or thinking clearly), emergency attention is required. Fluids containing a proper balance of replacement electrolytes are given orally or intravenously with continuing assessment of electrolyte status; complete resolution is normal in all but the most extreme cases.

== Prognosis ==
The prognosis for dehydration depends on the cause and extent of dehydration. Mild dehydration normally resolves with oral hydration. Chronic dehydration, such as from physically demanding jobs or decreased thirst, can lead to chronic kidney disease. Elderly people with dehydration are at higher risk of confusion, urinary tract infections, falls, and even delayed wound healing. In children with mild to moderate dehydration, oral hydration is adequate for a full recovery.

== See also ==
- Oral rehydration therapy
- Terminal dehydration
- Dryness (medical)
- Hypernatremia
