= Diabetes insipidus =

Condition characterized by large amounts of dilute urine and increased thirst

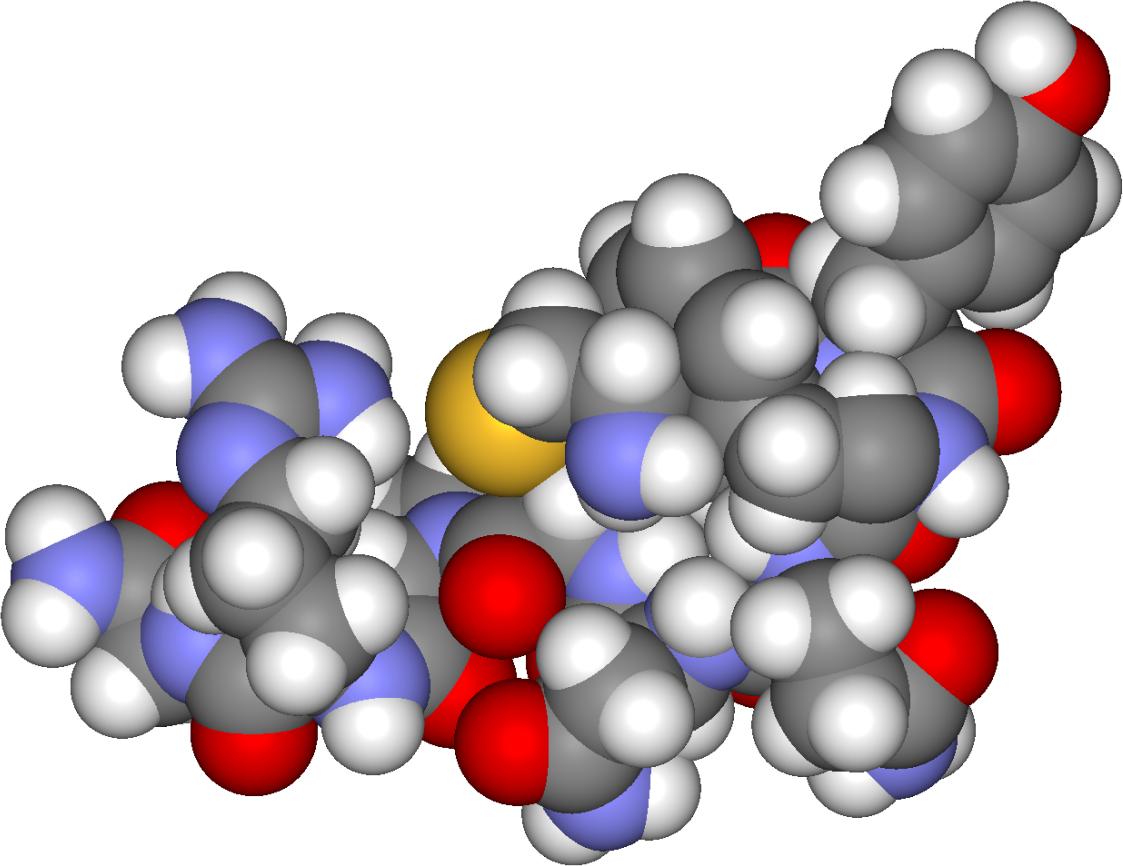
- Vasopressin
- Pronunciation: Diabetes: /ˌdaɪ.əˈbiːtiːz/ or /ˌdaɪ.əˈbiːtɪs/
- Specialty: Endocrinology
- Symptoms: Large amounts of dilute urine, increased thirst
- Complications: Dehydration, seizures
- Usual onset: Any age
- Types: AVP-D (central); AVP-R (nephrogenic); dipsogenic; gestational
- Causes: Depends on the type
- Diagnostic method: Urine tests, blood tests, fluid deprivation test
- Differential diagnosis: Diabetes mellitus
- Treatment: Drinking sufficient fluids
- Medication: Desmopressin, thiazides, aspirin
- Prognosis: Good with treatment
- Frequency: 3 per 100,000 per year

Diabetes insipidus (DI) is a condition characterized by large amounts of dilute urine and increased thirst. The amount of urine produced can be nearly twenty liters (5.3 U.S. gal) per day. Reduction of fluid has little effect on the concentration of the urine. Complications may include dehydration or seizures.

There are four types of DI, each with a different set of causes.

1. Central DI (CDI), now known as arginine vasopressin deficiency (AVP-D), is due to a lack of vasopressin (antidiuretic hormone) production. This can be due to injury to the hypothalamus or pituitary gland or due to genetics.
2. Nephrogenic DI (NDI), also known as arginine vasopressin resistance (AVP-R), occurs when the kidneys do not respond properly to vasopressin.
3. Dipsogenic DI is a result of excessive fluid intake due to damage to the hypothalamic thirst mechanism. It occurs more often in those with certain psychiatric disorders or on certain medications.
4. Gestational DI occurs only during pregnancy.

Treatment involves drinking sufficient fluids to prevent dehydration. Other treatments depend on the type. In central and gestational DI, treatment is with desmopressin. Nephrogenic DI may be treated by addressing the underlying cause or by the use of a thiazide, aspirin or ibuprofen. The number of new cases of diabetes insipidus each year is 3 in 100,000. Central DI usually starts between the ages of 10 and 20 and occurs in males and females equally. Nephrogenic DI can begin at any age. The term diabetes is derived from the Greek word meaning siphon.

== Pathophysiology ==
Electrolyte and volume homeostasis is a complex mechanism that balances the body's requirements for blood pressure and the main electrolytes sodium and potassium. In general, electrolyte regulation precedes volume regulation. When the volume is severely depleted, however, the body will retain water at the expense of deranging electrolyte levels.

The regulation of urine production occurs in the hypothalamus, which produces ADH in the supraoptic and paraventricular nuclei. After synthesis, the hormone is transported in neurosecretory granules down the axon of the hypothalamic neuron to the posterior lobe of the pituitary gland, where it is stored for later release. In addition, the hypothalamus regulates the sensation of thirst in the ventromedial nucleus by sensing increases in serum osmolarity and relaying this information to the cortex.

Neurogenic/central DI results from a lack of ADH; occasionally it can present with decreased thirst as regulation of thirst and ADH production occur in close proximity in the hypothalamus. It is encountered as a result of hypoxic encephalopathy, neurosurgery, autoimmunity or cancer, or sometimes without an underlying cause (idiopathic).

The main effector organ for fluid homeostasis is the kidney. ADH acts by increasing water permeability in the collecting ducts and distal convoluted tubules; specifically, it acts on proteins called aquaporins and more specifically aquaporin 2 in the following cascade. When released, ADH binds to V2 G-protein coupled receptors within the distal convoluted tubules, increasing cyclic AMP, which couples with protein kinase A, stimulating translocation of the aquaporin 2 channel stored in the cytoplasm of the distal convoluted tubules and collecting ducts into the apical membrane. These transcribed channels allow water into the collecting duct cells. The increase in permeability allows for the reabsorption of water into the bloodstream, thus concentrating the urine.

Nephrogenic DI results from a lack of aquaporin channels in the distal collecting duct (decreased surface expression and transcription). It is seen in lithium toxicity, hypercalcemia, hypokalemia, or the release of ureteral obstruction. Therefore, a lack of ADH prevents water reabsorption and the osmolarity of the blood increases. With increased osmolarity, the osmoreceptors in the hypothalamus detect this change and stimulate thirst. With increased thirst, the person now experiences a polydipsia and polyuria cycle.

Hereditary forms of diabetes insipidus account for less than 10% of the cases of diabetes insipidus seen in clinical practice.

== Diagnosis ==
Diabetes insipidus can be diagnosed through imaging (MRI scans) and lab results (blood tests, urine tests, etc.), and help identify what type a patient has: arginine vasopressin deficiency (AVP-D) or arginine vasopressin resistance (AVP-R).

=== Cranial MRI Scan ===
A cranial MRI scan typically diagnoses neurogenic DI and typically show the following, hyper intensities, pituitary stalk thickening which identify signs of hypothalamic/pituitary dysfunction.

=== Water Deprivation Test ===
A water deprivation test, also known as an ADH stimulation test, checks how your body responds when you do not drink any fluids for several hours. During the test, your urine output is measured, and you may also have blood tests to check antidiuretic hormone (ADH) levels as well as substances like glucose, calcium, and potassium. If you have diabetes insipidus (DI), you will keep passing large amounts of very dilute urine, with low levels of other substances, instead of producing small amount of concentrated urine. A large amount of sugar in the urine may point to type 1 or type 2 diabetes rather than DI.

=== Vasopressin Test ===
After the water deprivation test, you may be given a small dose of vasopressin (AVP), usually by injection, to see how your body responds. This helps identify the type of diabetes insipidus you have. If the AVP stops you from peeing, it likely means your body is not making enough AVP, and you may be diagnosed with AVP-D. If you still keep peeing after the dose, it suggests your body already has enough AVP but your kidneys are not responding to it, which may mean AVP-R.

== Types of DI (specific diagnosis pathways) ==
To distinguish DI from other causes of excess urination, blood glucose levels (sugar is normal in DI), bicarbonate levels, and calcium levels need to be tested. Measurement of blood electrolytes can reveal a high sodium level (hypernatremia as dehydration develops). Urinalysis demonstrates a dilute urine with a low specific gravity. Urine osmolarity and electrolyte levels are typically low.

A fluid deprivation test is another way of distinguishing DI from other causes of excessive urination. If there is no change in fluid loss, giving desmopressin can determine if DI is caused by:

1. a defect in ADH production
2. a defect in the kidneys' response to ADH

This test measures the changes in body weight, urine output, and urine composition when fluids are withheld to induce dehydration. The body's normal response to dehydration is to conserve water by concentrating the urine. Those with DI continue to urinate large amounts of dilute urine in spite of water deprivation. In primary polydipsia, the urine osmolality should increase and stabilize at above 280 mOsm/kg with fluid restriction, while a stabilization at a lower level indicates diabetes insipidus. Stabilization in this test means, more specifically, when the increase in urine osmolality is less than 30 Osm/kg per hour for at least three hours. Sometimes measuring blood levels of ADH toward the end of this test is also necessary, but is more time-consuming to perform.

To distinguish between the main forms, desmopressin stimulation is also used; desmopressin can be taken by injection, a nasal spray, or a tablet. While taking desmopressin, a person should drink fluids or water only when thirsty and not at other times, as this can lead to sudden fluid accumulation in the central nervous system. If desmopressin reduces urine output and increases urine osmolarity, the hypothalamic production of ADH is deficient, and the kidney responds normally to exogenous vasopressin (desmopressin). If the DI is due to kidney pathology, desmopressin does not change either urine output or osmolarity (since the endogenous vasopressin levels are already high).

Whilst diabetes insipidus usually occurs with polydipsia, it can also rarely occur not only in the absence of polydipsia but in the presence of its opposite, adipsia (or hypodipsia). "Adipsic diabetes insipidus" is recognised as a marked absence of thirst even in response to hyperosmolality. In some cases of adipsic DI, the person may also fail to respond to desmopressin.

If central DI is suspected, testing of other hormones of the pituitary, as well as magnetic resonance imaging, particularly a pituitary MRI, is necessary to discover if a disease process (such as a prolactinoma, or histiocytosis, syphilis, tuberculosis or other tumor or granuloma) is affecting pituitary function. Complications in tumor removal may result in transient or permanent damage to the pituitary gland which directly impacts ADH production in the endocrine system. Most people with this form have either experienced past head trauma or have stopped ADH production for an unknown reason.

== Signs and symptoms ==
Excessive urination and extreme thirst and increased fluid intake (especially for cold water and sometimes ice or ice water) are typical for DI. The symptoms of excessive urination and extreme thirst are similar to what is seen in untreated diabetes mellitus, with the distinction that the urine does not contain glucose. Blurred vision is a rarity. Signs of dehydration may also appear in some individuals since the body cannot properly regulate the amount of the water it takes in.

Extreme urination continues throughout the day and the night. In children, DI can interfere with appetite, eating, weight gain and growth, as well. They may present with fever, vomiting or diarrhea. Adults with untreated DI may remain healthy for decades as long as enough water is consumed to offset the urinary losses. However, there is a continuous risk of dehydration and loss of potassium that may lead to hypokalemia.

== Cause ==
The several forms of diabetes insipidus are:

=== Central ===
Central (or Neurogenic) DI has many possible causes. According to the literature, the principal causes of central DI and their oft-cited approximate frequencies are as follows:

- Primary, Hereditary or Idiopathic – 30% (including autoimmune, genetic, and familial forms)
- Acquired:
  - Malignant or benign tumors of the brain or pituitary – 23%
  - Cranial surgery – 20%
  - Head trauma – varies, 16%-30.6%

=== Nephrogenic ===
Nephrogenic diabetes insipidus is due to the inability of the kidney to respond normally to vasopressin.

=== Dipsogenic ===
Dipsogenic DI or primary polydipsia results from excessive intake of fluids as opposed to deficiency of arginine vasopressin. It may be due to a defect or damage to the thirst mechanism, located in the hypothalamus, or due to mental illness. Treatment with desmopressin may lead to water intoxication.

=== Gestational ===
Gestational DI occurs only during pregnancy and the postpartum period. During pregnancy, women produce vasopressinase in the placenta, which breaks down antidiuretic hormone (ADH). Gestational DI is thought to occur with excessive production and/or impaired clearance of vasopressinase.

Most cases of gestational DI can be treated with desmopressin (DDAVP), but not vasopressin. In rare cases, however, an abnormality in the thirst mechanism causes gestational DI, and desmopressin should not be used.

Diabetes insipidus is also associated with some serious diseases of pregnancy, including pre-eclampsia, HELLP syndrome and acute fatty liver of pregnancy. These cause DI by impairing hepatic clearance of circulating vasopressinase.

== Treatment ==
Treatment involves drinking sufficient fluids to prevent dehydration. Other treatments depend on the type. In central and gestational DI treatment is with desmopressin. Nephrogenic DI may be treated by addressing the underlying cause or the use of a thiazide, aspirin, or ibuprofen.

=== Central ===
Central DI and gestational DI respond to DDAVP desmopressin, a synthetic vasopressin analogue that can be administered intranasally or orally. Its longer duration of antidiuretic action and reduced vasopressin effects compared to vasopressin makes it a useful treatment option for Central DI. Carbamazepine, an anticonvulsive medication, has also had some success in this type of DI. Also, gestational DI tends to abate on its own in four to six weeks following labor, though some women may develop it again in subsequent pregnancies. In dipsogenic DI, desmopressin is not usually an option.

=== Nephrogenic ===
Desmopressin will be ineffective in nephrogenic DI which is treated by reversing the underlying cause (if possible) and replacing the free water deficit. A thiazide diuretic, such as chlorthalidone or hydrochlorothiazide, can be used to create mild hypovolemia which encourages salt and water uptake in proximal tubule and thus improve nephrogenic diabetes insipidus. Amiloride has additional benefit of blocking Na uptake. Thiazide diuretics are sometimes combined with amiloride to prevent hypokalemia caused by the thiazides. It seems paradoxical to treat an extreme diuresis with a diuretic, and the exact mechanism of action is unknown but the thiazide diuretics will decrease distal convoluted tubule reabsorption of sodium and water, thereby causing diuresis. This decreases plasma volume, thus lowering the glomerular filtration rate and enhancing the absorption of sodium and water in the proximal nephron. Less fluid reaches the distal nephron, so overall fluid conservation is obtained.

Lithium-induced nephrogenic DI may be effectively managed with the administration of amiloride, a potassium-sparing diuretic often used in conjunction with thiazide or loop diuretics. Clinicians have been aware of lithium toxicity for many years, and traditionally have administered thiazide diuretics for lithium-induced polyuria and nephrogenic diabetes insipidus. However, amiloride has recently been shown to be a successful treatment for this condition.

== Etymology ==
The word "diabetes" (/ˌdaɪ.əˈbiːtiːz/ or /ˌdaɪ.əˈbiːtɪs/) comes from Latin diabētēs, which in turn comes from Ancient Greek: διαβήτης, romanized: diabētēs, which literally means "a passer through; a siphon". Ancient Greek physician Aretaeus of Cappadocia (fl. in the first century CE) used that word, with the intended meaning "excessive discharge of urine", as the name for the disease. Ultimately, the word comes from Greek διαβαίνειν (diabainein), meaning "to pass through", which is composed of δια- (dia-), meaning "through" and βαίνειν (bainein), meaning "to go". The word "diabetes" is first recorded in English, in the form "diabete", in a medical text written around 1425.

"Insipidus" comes from Latin language insipidus (tasteless), from Latin: in- "not" + sapidus "tasty" from sapere "have a taste"—the full meaning is "lacking flavor or zest; not tasty". Application of this name to DI arose from the fact that diabetes insipidus does not cause glycosuria (excretion of glucose into the urine).

== See also ==
- Diabetes mellitus
- Polyuria
- Polydipsia
