= Diuresis =

Increase in urine production

Diuresis (/ˌdaɪjʊˈriːsɪs/) is the excretion of urine, especially when excessive (polyuria). The term collectively denotes the physiologic processes underpinning increased urine production by the kidneys during maintenance of fluid balance.

In healthy people, the drinking of extra water produces mild diuresis to maintain the body water balance. Many people with health issues, such as heart failure and kidney failure, need diuretic medications to help their kidneys deal with the fluid overload of edema. These drugs promote water loss via urine production. The concentrations of electrolytes in the blood are closely linked to fluid balance, so any action or problem involving fluid intake or output (such as polydipsia, polyuria, diarrhea, heat exhaustion, starting or changing doses of diuretics, and others) can require management of electrolytes, whether through self-care in mild cases or with help from health professionals in moderate or severe cases.

== Osmotic diuresis ==
Osmotic diuresis is the increase of urination rate caused by the presence of certain substances in the proximal tubule (PCT) of the kidneys. The excretion occurs when substances such as glucose enter the kidney tubules and cannot be reabsorbed (due to a pathological state or the normal nature of the substance). The substances cause an increase in the osmotic pressure within the tubule, causing retention of water within the lumen, and thus reduces the reabsorption of water, increasing urine output (i.e., diuresis). The same effect can be seen in therapeutics such as mannitol, which is used to increase urine output and decrease extracellular fluid volume.

Substances in the circulation can also increase the amount of circulating fluid by increasing the osmolarity of the blood. This has the effect of pulling water from the interstitial space, making more water available in the blood, and causing the kidney to compensate by removing it as urine. In hypotension, colloids are used often intravenously to increase circulating volume in themselves, but as they exert a certain amount of osmotic pressure, water is therefore also moved, further increasing circulating volume. As blood pressure increases, the kidney removes the excess fluid as urine. Sodium, chloride and potassium are excreted in osmotic diuresis, originating from diabetes mellitus (DM). Osmotic diuresis results in dehydration from polyuria and the classic polydipsia (excessive thirst) associated with DM.

== Forced diuresis ==
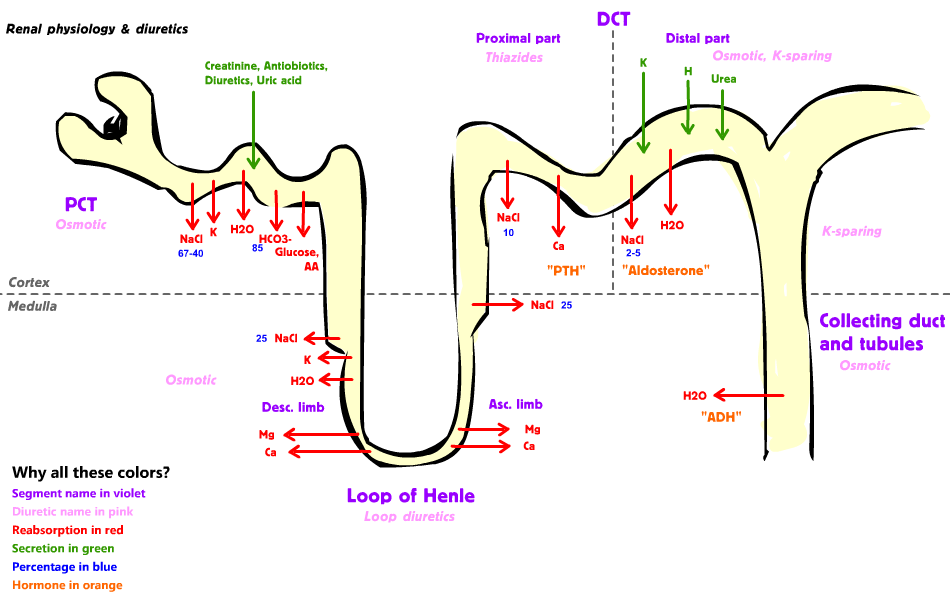
Renal diuretics

Forced diuresis (increased urine formation by diuretics and fluid) may enhance the excretion of certain drugs in urine and is used to treat drug overdose or poisoning of these drugs and hemorrhagic cystitis.

=== Diuretics ===
Most diuretic drugs are either weak acids or weak bases. When urine is made alkaline, elimination of acidic drugs in the urine is increased. The converse applies for alkaline drugs. This method is only of therapeutic significance where the drug is excreted in active form in urine and where the pH of urine can be adjusted to levels above or below the pK value of the active form of drug. For acidic drugs, urine pH should be above the pK value of that drug, and converse for the basic drugs. It is because the ionization of acidic drug is increased in alkaline urine and ionized drugs cannot easily cross a plasma membrane so cannot re-enter blood from kidney tubules. This method is ineffective for drugs that are strongly protein bound (e.g., tricyclic antidepressants) or which have a large apparent volume of distribution (e.g. paracetamol, tricyclic antidepressants).

For forced alkaline diuresis, sodium bicarbonate is added to the infusion fluid to make blood and, in turn, urine alkaline. Potassium replacement becomes of utmost importance in this setting because potassium is usually lost in urine. If blood levels of potassium are depleted below normal levels, then hypokalemia occurs, which promotes bicarbonate ion retention and prevents bicarbonate excretion, thus interfering with alkalinization of the urine. Forced alkaline diuresis has been used to increase the excretion of acidic drugs like salicylates and phenobarbitone, and is recommended for rhabdomyolysis.

For forced acid diuresis, ascorbic acid (vitamin C) is sometimes used. Ammonium chloride has also been used for forced acid diuresis, but it is a toxic compound. Usually, however, this technique only produces a slight increase in the renal clearance of the drug. Forced acid diuresis is rarely done in practice, but can be used to enhance the elimination of cocaine, amphetamine, quinine, quinidine, atropine and strychnine when poisoning by these drugs has occurred.

== Rebound diuresis ==
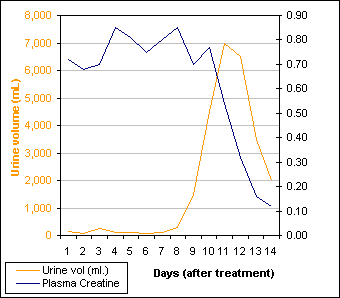
An example of the pattern of urine flow and plasma creatinine levels following acute tubular necrosis

Rebound diuresis refers to the sudden resurgence of urine flow that occurs during recovery from acute kidney injury. In acute kidney injury, particularly acute tubular necrosis, the tubules become blocked with cellular matter, particularly necrotic sloughing of dead cells. This debris obstructs the flow of filtrate, which results in reduced output of urine. The arterial supply of the nephron is linked to the filtration apparatus (glomerulus), and reduced perfusion leads to reduced blood flow; usually this is the result of pre-renal pathology.

The kidney's resorptive mechanisms are particularly energetic, using nearly 100% of the O_{2} supplied. Thus, the kidney is particularly sensitive to reduction in blood supply. This phenomenon occurs because renal flow is restored prior to the normal resorption function of the renal tubule. As shown by the graph, urine flow recovers rapidly and subsequently overshoots the typical daily output (between 800 mL and 2L in most people). Since the kidney's resorption capacity takes longer to re-establish, there is a minor lag in function that follows recovery of flow. A good reference range for plasma creatinine is between 0.07 - 0.12 mmol/L.

== Immersion diuresis ==
Immersion diuresis is caused by immersion of the body in water (or equivalent liquid). It is mainly caused by lower temperature and by pressure.

The temperature component is caused by water drawing heat away from the body and causing vasoconstriction of the cutaneous blood vessels within the body to conserve heat. The body detects an increase in the blood pressure and inhibits the release of vasopressin (also known as antidiuretic hormone (ADH)), causing an increase in the production of urine. The pressure component is caused by the hydrostatic pressure of the water directly increasing blood pressure. Its significance is indicated by the fact that the temperature of the water does not substantially affect the rate of diuresis. Partial immersion of only the limbs does not cause increased urination. Thus, the hand in warm water trick (immersing the hand of a sleeping person in water to make them urinate) has no support from the mechanism of immersion diuresis. On the other hand, sitting up to the neck in a pool for a few hours clearly increases the excretion of water, salts, and urea.

== Cold-induced diuresis ==
Cold-induced diuresis, or cold diuresis, is a phenomenon that occurs in humans after exposure to a hypothermic environment, usually during mild to moderate hypothermia. It is currently thought to be caused by the redirection of blood from the extremities to the core due to peripheral vasoconstriction, which increases the fluid volume in the core. Overall, acute exposure to cold is thought to induce a diuretic response due to an increase mean arterial pressure.

The arterial cells of the kidneys sense the increase in blood pressure and signal the kidneys to excrete superfluous fluid in an attempt to stabilize the pressure. The kidneys increase urine production and fill the bladder; when the bladder fills, the individual may then feel the urge to urinate. This phenomenon usually occurs after mental function has decreased to a level significantly below normal. Cold diuresis has been observed in cases of accidental hypothermia as well as a side effect of therapeutic hypothermia, specifically during the induction phase.

== See also ==
- Ketosis – Using body fats as fuel instead of carbohydrates
- Polydipsia – Excessive thirst or excess drinking
- Sulfonylurea – Class of organic compounds used in medicine and agriculture
- Ion trapping
- Hemodialysis – Medical procedure for purifying blood
- Peritoneal dialysis – Blood purification procedure using the abdominal peritoneum
- Hemoperfusion
- Hemofiltration – Medical procedure
