= Polydipsia =

Excessive thirst or excess drinking

- Specialty: Endocrinology, psychiatry

Polydipsia is excessive thirst or excess drinking. The word derives from Greek πολυδίψιος (poludípsios) 'very thirsty', which is derived from Ancient Greek πολύς (polús) 'much, many' and δίψα (dípsa) 'thirst'. Polydipsia is a nonspecific symptom in various medical disorders. It also occurs as an abnormal behaviour in some non-human animals, such as in birds.

== Causes ==
=== Diabetes ===
Polydipsia can be characteristic of diabetes mellitus, often as an initial symptom. It is observed in cases of poorly controlled diabetes, which is sometimes the result of low patient adherence to anti-diabetic medication.

Diabetes insipidus ("tasteless" diabetes, as opposed to diabetes mellitus) can also cause polydipsia.

=== Other physiological causes ===
It can also be caused by a change in the osmolality of the extracellular fluids of the body, hypokalemia, decreased blood volume (as occurs during major hemorrhage), and other conditions that create a water deficit. This is usually a result of osmotic diuresis.

Polydipsia is also a symptom of anticholinergic poisoning. Zinc is also known to reduce symptoms of polydipsia by causing the body to absorb fluids more efficiently (reduction of diarrhea, induces constipation) and it causes the body to retain more sodium; thus a zinc deficiency can be a possible cause. The combination of polydipsia and (nocturnal) polyuria is also seen in (primary) hyperaldosteronism (which often goes with hypokalemia). Antipsychotics can have side effects such as dry mouth that may make the patient feel thirsty.

=== Primary polydipsia ===
Primary polydipsia describes excessive thirst and water intake caused in the absence of physiological stimuli to drink. This includes both psychogenic primary polydipsia and non-psychogenic primary polydipsia, such as in patients with autoimmune chronic hepatitis with severely elevated globulin levels.

Psychogenic polydipsia is an excessive water intake seen in some patients with mental illnesses such as schizophrenia, or with developmental disabilities. It should be taken very seriously, as the amount of water ingested exceeds the amount that can be excreted by the kidneys, and can on rare occasions be life-threatening as the body's serum sodium level is diluted to an extent that seizures and cardiac arrest can occur.

While psychogenic polydipsia is generally not found outside the population of serious mental disorders, there is some anecdotal evidence of a milder form (typically called 'habit polydipsia' or 'habit drinking') that can be found in the absence of psychosis or other mental conditions. The excessive levels of fluid intake may result in a false diagnosis of diabetes insipidus, since the chronic ingestion of excessive water can produce diagnostic results that closely mimic those of mild diabetes insipidus. As discussed in the entry on diabetes insipidus, "Habit drinking (in its severest form termed psychogenic polydipsia) is the most common imitator of diabetes insipidus at all ages. While many adult cases in the medical literature are associated with mental disorders, most patients with habit polydipsia have no other detectable disease. The distinction is made during the water deprivation test, as some degree of urinary concentration above isosmolar is usually obtained before the patient becomes dehydrated." However, prior to a water deprivation test, consideration should be given to a psychiatric consult to see whether it is possible to rule out psychogenic polydipsia or habit polydipsia.

== Diagnosis ==
Polydipsia is a symptom (evidence of a disease state), not a disease in itself. It is often accompanied by polyuria (excessive urination) and low sodium levels. Investigations directed at diagnosing diabetes insipidus and diabetes mellitus can be useful. Blood serum tests can also provide useful information about the osmolality of the body's extracellular fluids. A decrease in osmolality caused by excess water intake will decrease the serum concentration of red blood cells, blood urea nitrogen (BUN), and sodium.

== See also ==
- Adipsia
- Human homeostasis
- Polydipsia in birds
- Polyphagia
- Potomania
- Primary polydipsia
- Water intoxication
- Hyponatremia
- Diabetes insipidus
- Diabetes mellitus
- Polyuria
