= Desmopressin =

Medication

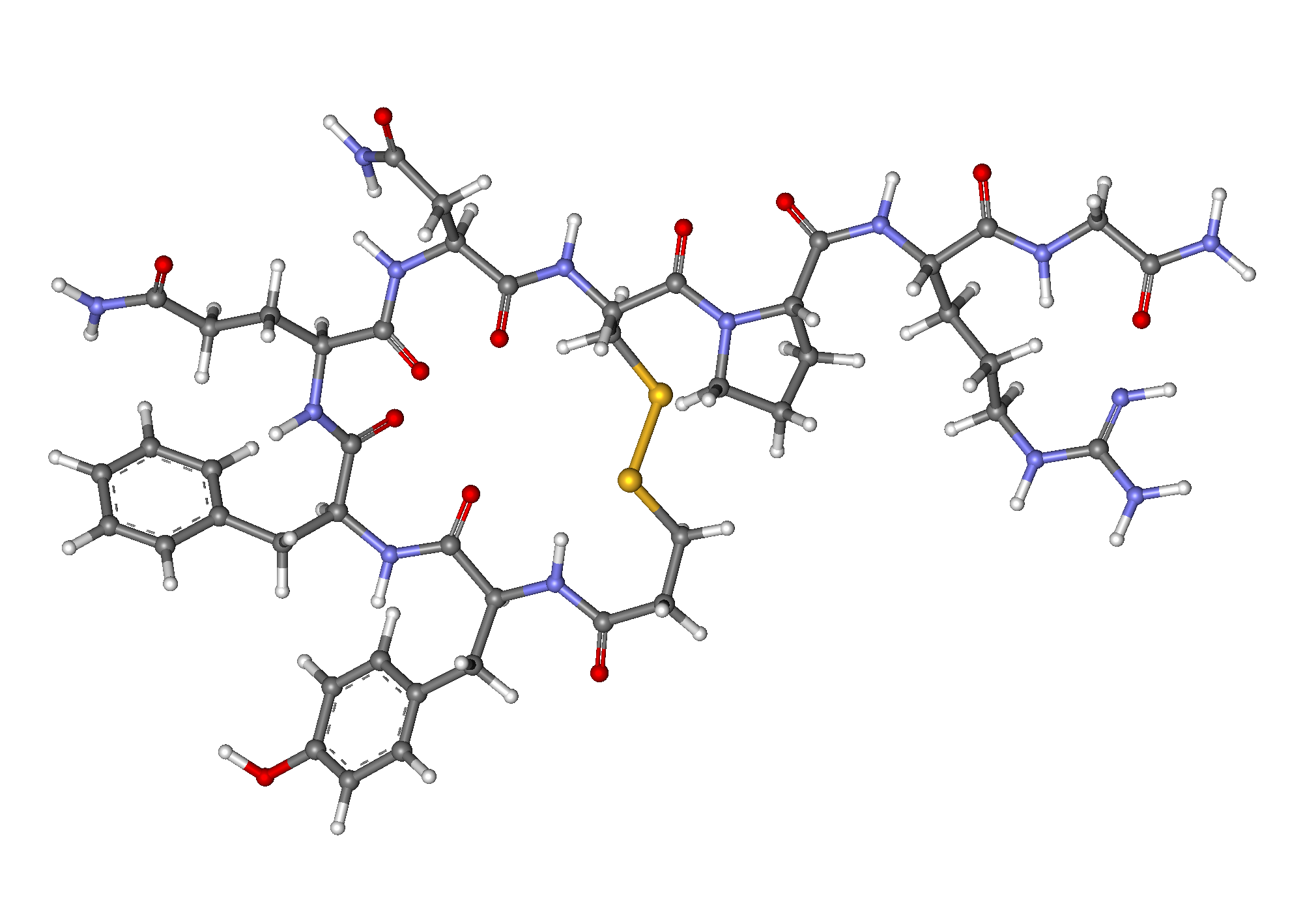

Clinical data
- Trade names: Ddavp, others
- Other names: Desmopressin acetate (USAN US)
- AHFS/Drugs.com: Monograph
- MedlinePlus: a608010
- License data: US DailyMed: Desmopressin
- Pregnancy category: AU: B2
- Routes of administration: Intravenous, intramuscular, subcutaneous, intranasal, by mouth, sublingual
- ATC code: H01BA02 (WHO)

Legal status
- Legal status: AU: S4 (Prescription only); UK: POM (Prescription only); US: ℞-only

Pharmacokinetic data
- Bioavailability: Variable; 0.08–0.16% (by mouth)
- Protein binding: 50%
- Elimination half-life: 1.5–2.5 hours
- Excretion: Kidney

Identifiers
- IUPAC name: (2S)-N-[(2R)-1-[(2-amino-2-oxoethyl)amino]-5- (diaminomethylideneamino)-1-oxopentan-2-yl]-1- [(4R,7S,10S,13S,16S)-7-(2-amino-2-oxoethyl)-10- (3-amino-3-oxopropyl)-16-[(4-hydroxyphenyl)methyl]- 6,9,12,15,18-pentaoxo-13-(phenylmethyl)1,2-dithia- 5,8,11,14,17-pentazacycloicosane-4-carbonyl] pyrrolidine-2-carboxamide
- CAS Number: 16679-58-6
- PubChem CID: 5311065
- IUPHAR/BPS: 2182
- DrugBank: DB00035
- ChemSpider: 4470602
- UNII: ENR1LLB0FP
- KEGG: D00291
- ChEMBL: ChEMBL1429
- CompTox Dashboard (EPA): DTXSID1048259
- ECHA InfoCard: 100.037.009

Chemical and physical data
- Formula: C_{46}H_{64}N_{14}O_{12}S_{2}
- Molar mass: 1069.22 g·mol^{−1}
- 3D model (JSmol): Interactive image
- SMILES: c1ccc(cc1)C[C@H]2C(=O)N[C@H](C(=O)N[C@H](C(=O)N[C@@H](CSSCCC(=O)N[C@H](C(=O)N2)Cc3ccc(cc3)O)C(=O)N4CCC[C@H]4C(=O)N[C@H](CCCNC(=N)N)C(=O)NCC(=O)N)CC(=O)N)CCC(=O)N
- InChI: InChI=1S/C46H64N14O12S2/c47-35(62)15-14-29-40(67)58-32(22-36(48)63)43(70)59-33(45(72)60-18-5-9-34(60)44(71)56-28(8-4-17-52-46(50)51)39(66)53-23-37(49)64)24-74-73-19-16-38(65)54-30(21-26-10-12-27(61)13-11-26)41(68)57-31(42(69)55-29)20-25-6-2-1-3-7-25/h1-3,6-7,10-13,28-34,61H,4-5,8-9,14-24H2,(H2,47,62)(H2,48,63)(H2,49,64)(H,53,66)(H,54,65)(H,55,69)(H,56,71)(H,57,68)(H,58,67)(H,59,70)(H4,50,51,52)/t28-,29+,30+,31+,32+,33+,34+/m1/s1; Key:NFLWUMRGJYTJIN-PNIOQBSNSA-N

Desmopressin, sold under the trade name Ddavp among others, is a medication used to treat diabetes insipidus, bedwetting, hemophilia A, von Willebrand disease, and high blood urea levels. In hemophilia A and von Willebrand disease, it should only be used for mild to moderate cases. It may be given in the nose, by injection into a vein, by mouth, or under the tongue.

Common side effects include headaches, diarrhea, and low blood sodium. The low blood sodium that results may cause seizures. It should not be used in people with significant kidney problems or low blood sodium. It appears to be safe to use during pregnancy. It is a synthetic analogue of vasopressin, the hormone that plays roles in the control of the body's osmotic balance, blood pressure regulation, kidney function, and reduction of urine production.

Desmopressin was approved for medical use in the United States in 1978. It is on the World Health Organization's List of Essential Medicines. It is available as a generic medication.

== Medical uses ==
=== Bed wetting ===
Desmopressin is used to treat nocturnal enuresis (bedwetting).

=== Nocturia ===
In 2017, the US Food and Drug Administration (FDA) approved desmopressin acetate nasal spray (Noctiva) for adults who awaken at least two times per night to urinate due to a condition known as nocturnal polyuria.

=== Bleeding disorders ===
Desmopressin (Ddavp) is usually the first line treatment for mild to moderate type 1 von Willebrand disease. It is not recommended in severe disease or in those with abnormal factor VIII. Usefulness in type 2A, 2M, or 2N von Willebrand disease is variable. Generally not recommended in 2B and type 3 von Willebrand disease.

Desmopressin is only recommended in mild hemophilia A. It may be used both for bleeding due to trauma or to try to prevent bleeding due to surgery. It is not effective in the treatment of hemophilia B (factor IX deficiency) or severe hemophilia A. May also be used in uremia induced bleeding.

=== Diabetes insipidus ===
Desmopressin (Desmoda) is indicated for the management of central diabetes insipidus as antidiuretic replacement therapy.

== Side effects ==
- headaches
- facial flushing
- nausea
- hyponatremia
- seizures

US drug regulators added warning to the nasal sprays after two people died and fifty-nine other people had seizures. This occurred due to hyponatremia, a deficit of the body's sodium levels, and the nasal spray is no longer approved for use in children in the United States. However, US drug regulators have said that desmopressin tablets can still be considered safe for treatment of nocturnal enuresis in children as long as the person is otherwise healthy.

A body needs to maintain a balance of water and sodium. If sodium levels become too low (hyponatremia) – either as a result of increased water take-up or reduced salt levels – a person may have seizures and, in extreme cases, may die.

== Mechanism of action ==
Desmopressin works by limiting the amount of water that is eliminated in the urine; that is, it is an antidiuretic. It works at the level of the renal collecting duct by binding to V2 receptors, which signal for the translocation of aquaporin channels via cytosolic vesicles to the apical membrane of the collecting duct. The presence of these aquaporin channels in the distal nephron causes increasing water reabsorption from the urine, which becomes passively re-distributed from the nephron to systemic circulation by way of basolateral membrane channels. Desmopressin also stimulates release of von Willebrand factor from endothelial cells by acting on the V2 receptor. It also increases endogenous levels of factor VIII, making it useful in the treatment of hemophilia A.

Desmopressin is degraded more slowly than recombinant vasopressin, and requires less frequent administration. In addition, it has little effect on blood pressure, while vasopressin may cause arterial hypertension. Vasopressin stimulates the release of ACTH, which indirectly increases responsiveness of alpha-1 receptor in blood vessel smooth muscle, increasing vessel tone and blood pressure. Several studies have shown that Desmopressin does not stimulate ACTH release (except in Cushing's Disease), and therefore does not directly raise blood pressure, however, one study showed that it stimulates ACTH release in over 50% of healthy subjects. Additionally, desmopressin is able to enhance ACTH and cortisol release in normal subjects following oCRH administration, but not in patients with anorexia nervosa.
