= Balanced salt solution =

Aequous solution with a physiological pH and isotonic salt concentration

A balanced salt solution (BSS) is a solution made to a physiological pH and isotonic salt concentration. Solutions most commonly include sodium, potassium, calcium, magnesium, and chloride. Balanced salt solutions are used for washing tissues and cells and are usually combined with other agents to treat the tissues and cells. They provide the cells with water and inorganic ions, while maintaining a physiological pH and osmotic pressure.

Sometimes glucose is added as an energy source and phenol red is used as a pH indicator.

In medicine, balanced salt solutions can be used as an irrigation solution such as during intraocular surgery and to replace intraocular fluids.

== Balanced salt solutions ==
- Alsever's solution
- Earle's balanced salt solution (EBSS)
- Gey's balanced salt solution (GBSS)
- Hanks' balanced salt solution (HBSS)
- (Dulbecco's) Phosphate buffered saline (PBS)
- Puck's balanced salt solution
- Ringer's balanced salt solution (RBSS)
- Simm's balanced salt solution (SBSS)
- TRIS-buffered saline (TBS)
- Tyrode's balanced salt solution (TBSS)

=== Surgical irrigation solutions ===
- BSS (ophthalmic irrigation solution) (produced by Alcon)
  - Composition per 1 mL: sodium chloride (NaCl) 6.4 mg, potassium chloride (KCl) 0.75 mg, calcium chloride dihydrate (CaCl_{2}·2H_{2}O) 0.48 mg, magnesium chloride hexahydrate (MgCl_{2}•6H_{2}O) 0.3 mg, sodium acetate trihydrate (C_{2}H_{3}NaO_{2}·3H_{2}O) 3.9 mg, sodium citrate dihydrate (C_{6}H_{5}Na_{3}O_{7}·2H_{2}O) 1.7 mg, sodium hydroxide and/or hydrochloric acid (to adjust pH), and water for injection. The pH is approximately 7.5. The osmolality is approximately 300 mOsm/Kg.
- BSS Plus (ophthalmic irrigation solution) (produced by Alcon)
  - Composition per 1 mL (once preparation complete): sodium chloride 7.14 mg (122.17 mmol), potassium chloride 0.38 mg (5.097 mmol), calcium chloride dihydrate 0.154 mg (1.04754 mmol), magnesium chloride hexahydrate 0.2 mg (0.983767 mmol), dibasic sodium phosphate 0.42 mg (2.95858 mmol), sodium bicarbonate 2.1 mg (24.998 mmol), dextrose 0.92 mg (5.1067 mmol), glutathione disulfide (oxidized glutathione) 0.184 mg (0.3003 mmol), hydrochloric acid and/or sodium hydroxide (to adjust pH), in water for injection. The reconstituted product has a pH of approximately 7.4. Osmolality is approximately 305 mOsm.

== See also ==
- Saline (medicine)
- Intravenous sugar solution
