= Saline (medicine) =

Salt water for medical purposes

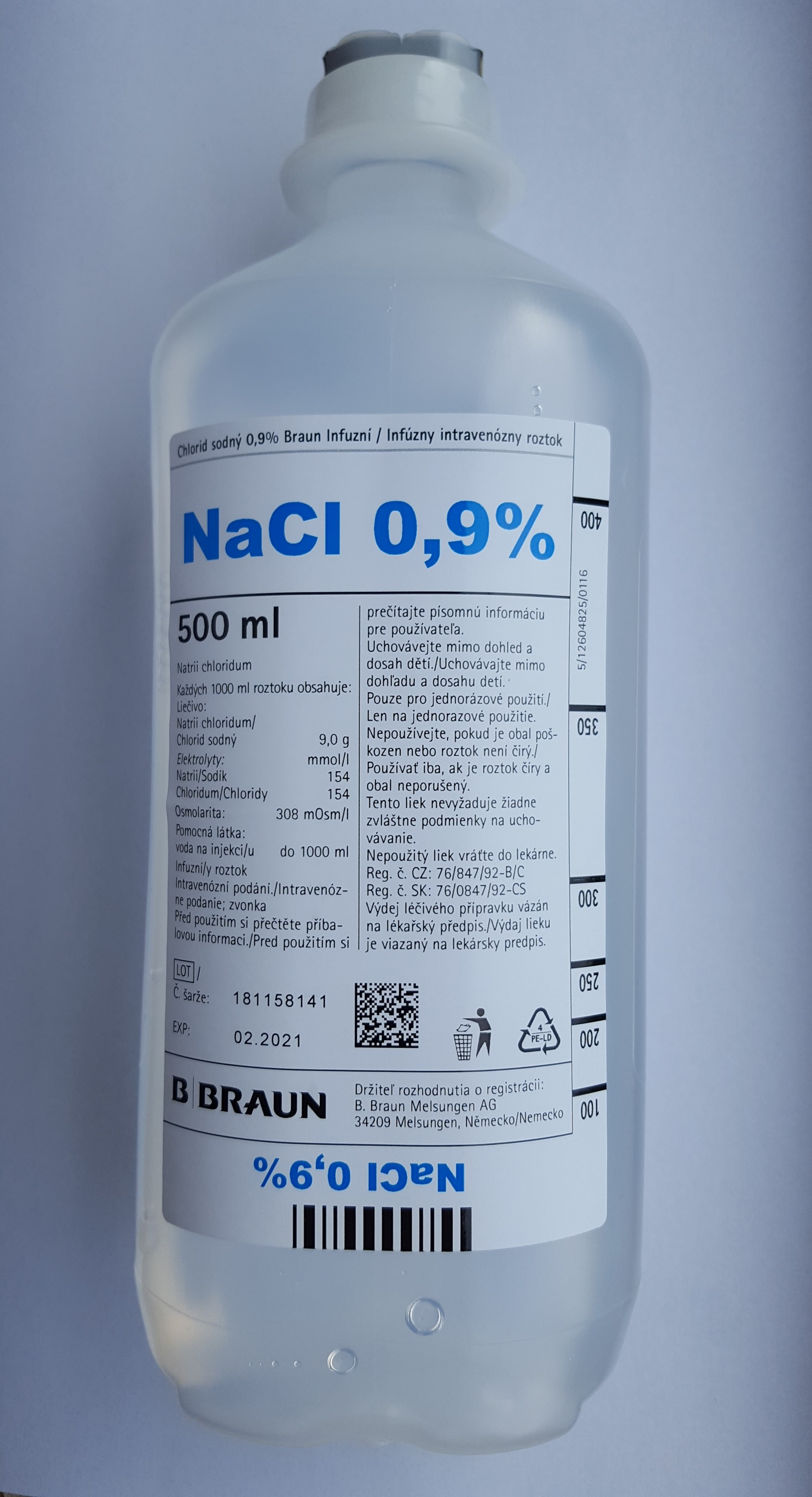
- Saline solution for intravenous infusion

Clinical data
- AHFS/Drugs.com: FDA Professional Drug Information
- License data: US DailyMed: Hypertonic_Saline
- Routes of administration: Intravenous, topical, subcutaneous
- ATC code: B05XA03 (WHO)

Identifiers
- CAS Number: 7647-14-5
- PubChem CID: 5234
- DrugBank: DB09153
- ChemSpider: 5044
- UNII: 451W47IQ8X
- KEGG: C13563
- ChEBI: CHEBI:26710
- ChEMBL: ChEMBL1200574

Chemical and physical data
- Formula: ClNa
- Molar mass: 58.44 g·mol^{−1}
- 3D model (JSmol): Interactive image
- SMILES: [Na+].[Cl-]
- InChI: InChI=1S/ClH.Na/h1H;/q;+1/p-1; Key:FAPWRFPIFSIZLT-UHFFFAOYSA-M

Saline (also known as saline solution) is a mixture of sodium chloride (salt) and water. It has several uses in medicine including cleaning wounds, removal and storage of contact lenses, and help with dry eyes. By injection into a vein, it is used to treat hypovolemia such as that from gastroenteritis and diabetic ketoacidosis. Large amounts may result in fluid overload, swelling, acidosis, and high blood sodium. In those with long-standing low blood sodium, excessive use may result in osmotic demyelination syndrome.

Saline is in the crystalloid family of medications. It is most commonly used as a sterile 9 g of salt per litre (0.9%) solution, known as normal saline. Higher and lower concentrations may also occasionally be used. Saline is acidic, with a pH of 5.5 (due mainly to dissolved carbon dioxide).

The medical use of saline began around 1831. It is on the World Health Organization's List of Essential Medicines. In 2023, sodium salts were the 227th most commonly prescribed medication in the United States, with more than 1 million prescriptions.

== Normal concentration ==
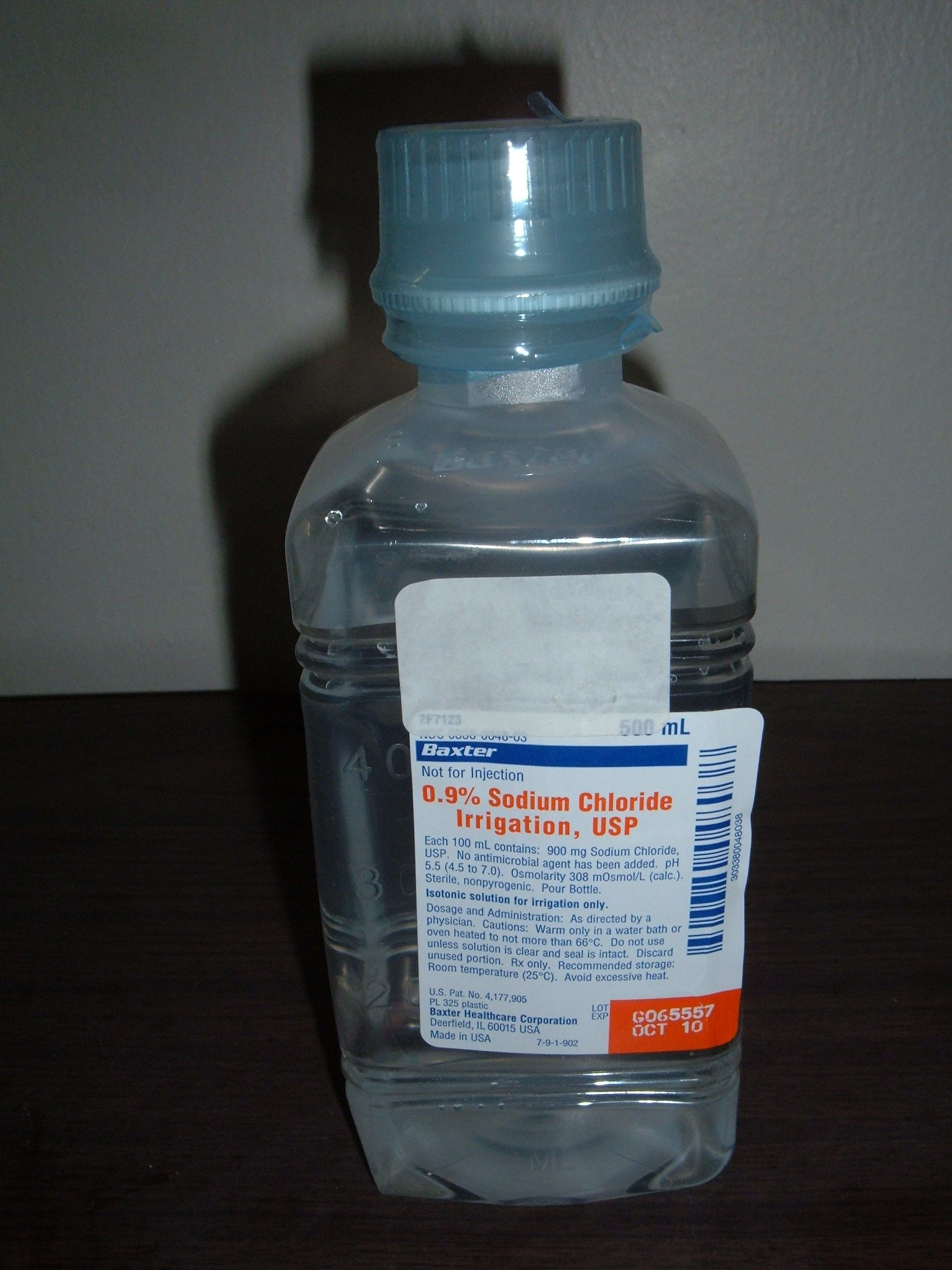
Saline solution for irrigation

Normal saline (NSS, NS or N/S) is the commonly used phrase for a solution of 0.90% w/v of NaCl, 308 mOsm/L or 9.0 g/L. Less commonly, this solution is referred to as physiological saline or isotonic saline (because it is approximately isotonic to blood serum, which makes it a physiologically normal solution). Although neither of those names is technically accurate because normal saline is not exactly like blood serum, they convey the practical effect usually seen: good fluid balance with minimal hypotonicity or hypertonicity. NS is used frequently in intravenous therapy for people who cannot take fluids orally and have developed or are in danger of developing dehydration. NS is also used for aseptic purpose. NS was typically the first fluid used when one's hypovolemia was severe enough to threaten the adequacy of blood circulation, and has long been believed to be the safest fluid to give quickly in large volumes; however, it is now known that rapid and/or high amount of NS infusion will cause metabolic acidosis, which is why other means of therapy like Ringer's lactate solution or Low Titer O Whole Blood (LTOWB) infusion have been proven to be better in the treatment of hypovolemia, especially in traumatically induced hypovolemic shock.

The solution is 9 grams of sodium chloride (NaCl) dissolved in water, to a total volume of 1000 mL. The mass of 1 mL of normal saline is 1.0046 grams at 22 °C. The molar mass of sodium chloride is approximately 58.4 g/mol. A concentration of 9 g/L therefore gives 154 mmol/L. Since NaCl dissociates into two ions (sodium and chloride), 1 molar NaCl is 2 osmolar. Thus, normal saline contains 154 mEq/L of Na^{+} and the same amount of Cl^{−}. This gives an osmolarity of 154 + 154 = 308, which is higher (i.e. more solute per litre) than that of blood (approximately 285). However, if the osmotic coefficient (a correction for non-ideal solutions) is taken into account, then the saline solution is much closer to isotonic. The osmotic coefficient of NaCl is about 0.93, which yields an osmolarity of 0.154 × 1000 × 2 × 0.93 = 286.44. Therefore, the osmolarity of normal saline is a close approximation to that of blood.

=== Usage ===
For medical purposes, saline is often used to flush wounds and skin abrasions. However, research indicates that it is no more effective than potable tap water. Normal saline will not burn or sting when applied.

Saline is also used in IV therapy, intravenously supplying extra water to rehydrate people or supplying the daily water and salt needs ("maintenance" needs) of a person who is unable to take them by mouth. Because infusing a solution of low osmolality can cause problems such as hemolysis, intravenous solutions with reduced saline concentrations (less than 0.9%) typically have dextrose (glucose) added to maintain a safe osmolality while providing less sodium chloride. The amount of normal saline infused depends largely on the needs of the person (e.g., ongoing diarrhea or heart failure).

IVs and catheters (e.g. a nephrostomy) may need to be flushed with saline to prevent clogging.

Saline is also often used for nasal washes to relieve some of the symptoms of rhinitis and the common cold. The solution exerts a softening and loosening influence on the mucus to make it easier to wash out and clear the nasal passages for both babies and adults. In very rare instances, fatal infection by the amoeba Naegleria fowleri can occur if it enters the body through the nose; therefore tap water must not be used for nasal irrigation. Water is only appropriate for this purpose if it is sterile, distilled, boiled, filtered, or disinfected.

Sterile isotonic saline is also used to fill breast implants for use in breast augmentation surgery, to correct congenital abnormalities such as tuberous breast deformity, and to correct breast asymmetry. Saline breast implants are also used in reconstructive surgery post-mastectomy.

==== Eyes ====
Eye drops are saline-containing drops used on the eye. Depending on the condition being treated, they may contain steroids, antihistamines, sympathomimetics, beta receptor blockers, parasympathomimetics, parasympatholytics, prostaglandins, non-steroidal anti-inflammatory drugs (NSAIDs), antibiotics or topical anesthetics. Eye drops sometimes do not have medications in them and are only lubricating and tear-replacing solutions.

==== Nose ====
There is tentative evidence that saline nasal irrigation may help with long term cases of rhinosinusitis. Evidence for use in cases of rhinosinusitis of short duration is unclear.

==== Scleral tattooing ====
Saline is used in scleral tattooing, coloring the white part of the human eye.

==== Tattoo lightening ====
Saline is used to lighten tattoos (including microblading tattoos) through the process of osmosis.

== Other concentrations ==
Concentrations lower and higher than normal also exist. High concentrations are used rarely in medicine but frequently in molecular biology.

=== Hypertonic saline ===
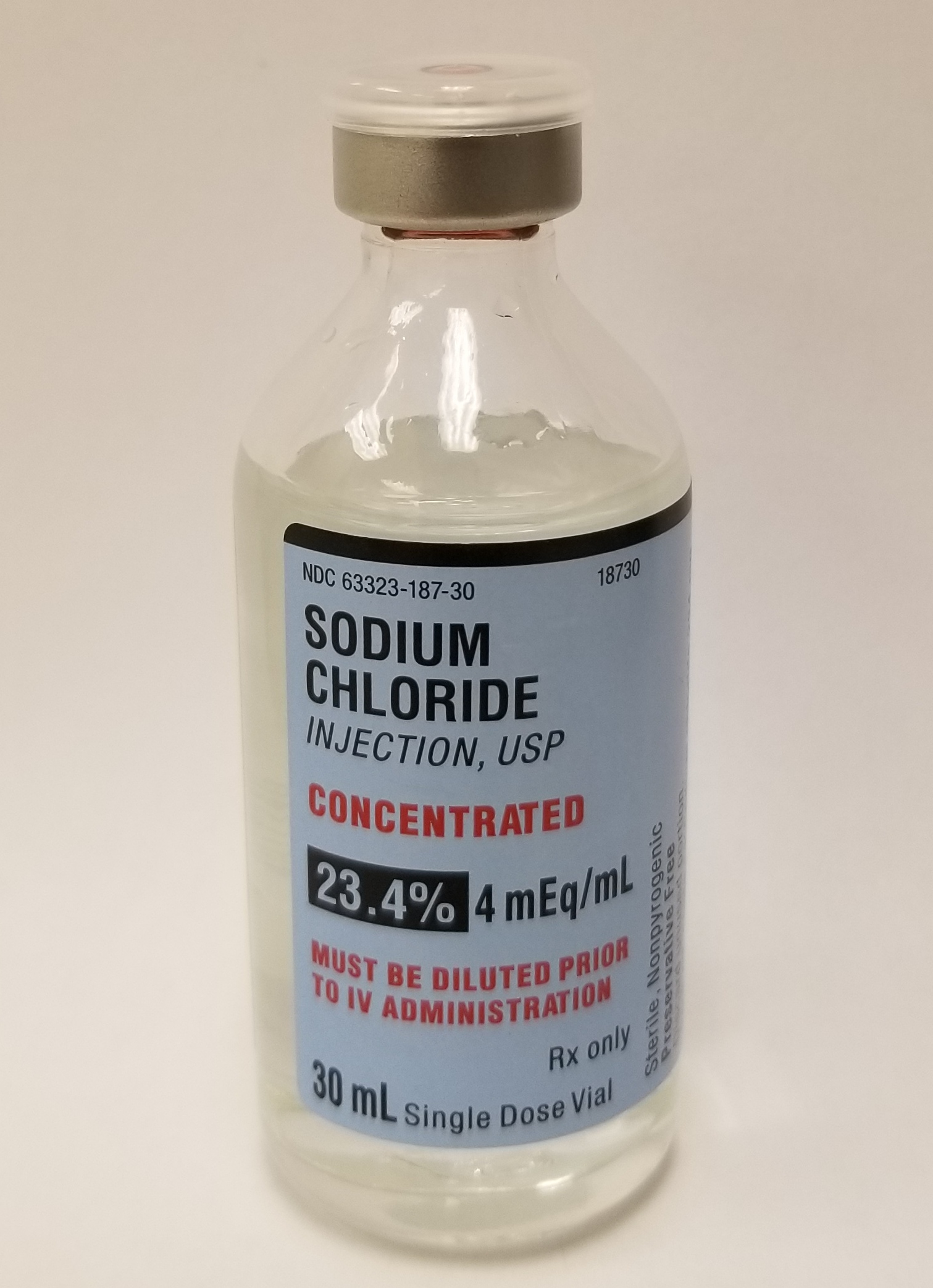
Vial of 23.4% sodium chloride

Hypertonic saline—7% NaCl solutions are considered mucoactive agents and thus are used to hydrate thick secretions (mucus) to make it easier to cough up and out (expectorate). 3% hypertonic saline solutions are also used in critical care settings, acutely increased intracranial pressure, or severe hyponatremia. Inhalation of hypertonic saline has also been shown to help in other respiratory problems, specifically bronchiolitis. Hypertonic saline is currently recommended by the Cystic Fibrosis Foundation as a primary part of a cystic fibrosis treatment regimen.

An 11% solution of xylitol with 0.65% saline stimulates the washing of the nasopharynx and affects the nasal pathogenic bacteria. This has been used in complementary and alternative medicine.

Hypertonic saline may be used in perioperative fluid management protocols to reduce excessive intravenous fluid infusions and lessen pulmonary complications. Hypertonic saline is used in treating hyponatremia and cerebral edema. Rapid correction of hyponatremia via hypertonic saline, or via any saline infusion > 40 mmol/L (Na+ having a valence of 1, 40 mmol/L = 40 mEq/L) greatly increases the risk of central pontine myelinolysis (CPM), and so requires constant monitoring of the person's response. Water privation combined with diuretic block does not produce as much risk of CPM as saline administration does; however, it does not correct hyponatremia as rapidly as administration of hypertonic saline does. Due to hypertonicity, administration may result in phlebitis and tissue necrosis. As such, concentrations greater than 3% NaCl should normally be administered via a central venous catheter, also known as a 'central line'. Such hypertonic saline is normally available in two strengths, the former of which is more commonly administered:

- 3% NaCl has 513 mEq/L of Na and Cl.
- 5% NaCl has 856 mEq/L of Na and Cl.

Hypertonic NaCl solutions that are less commonly used are 7% (1200 mEq/L) and 23.4% (approx 4000 mEq/L), both of which are used (also via central line), often in conjunction with supplementary diuretics, in the treatment of traumatic brain injury.

=== Less concentrated solutions ===
Other concentrations commonly used include:

- Half-normal saline (0.45% NaCl), often with "D5" (5% dextrose), contains 77 mEq/L of Na and Cl and 50 g/L dextrose.
- Quarter-normal saline (0.22% NaCl) has 39 mEq/L of Na and Cl and almost always contains 5% dextrose for osmolality reasons. It can be used alone in neonatal intensive care units.
- Dextrose (glucose) 4% in 0.18% saline is used sometimes for maintenance replacement.

== Solutions with added ingredients ==
In medicine, common types of saline isolutions include:

- Ringer's lactate solution
- Acetated Ringer's solution
- Oral rehydration solution
- Intravenous sugar solutions
  - 5% dextrose in normal saline (D5NS)
  - 10% dextrose in normal saline (D10NS)
  - 5% dextrose in half-normal saline (D5HNS)
  - 10% dextrose in half-normal saline (D10HNS)

And in cell biology, in addition to the above, the following are used:

- Phosphate buffered saline (PBS) (recipes from Dulbecco = D-PBS, Galfre, Kuchler, Ausubel etc.)
- TRIS-buffered saline (TBS) (recipes from Goldsmith, Ausubel, etc.)
- Hank's balanced salt solution (HBSS)
- Earle's balanced salt solution (EBSS)
- Standard saline citrate (SSC)
- HEPES-buffered saline (HBS) (recipes from Dittmar, Liu, Ausubel, etc.)
- Gey's balanced salt solution (GBSS)

== History ==
Saline was believed to have originated during the Indian Blue cholera pandemic that swept across Europe in 1831. William Brooke O'Shaughnessy, a recent graduate of Edinburgh Medical School, proposed in an article to medical journal The Lancet to inject people infected with cholera with highly oxygenated salts to treat the "universal stagnation of the venous system and rapid cessation of arterialisation of the blood" seen in people with severely dehydrated cholera. He found his treatment harmless in dogs, and his proposal was soon adopted by the physician Thomas Latta in treating people with cholera to beneficial effect. In the following decades, variations and alternatives to Latta's solution were tested and used in treating people with cholera. These solutions contained a range of concentrations of sodium, chloride, potassium, carbonate, phosphate, and hydroxide.

The breakthrough in achieving physiological concentrations was accomplished by Sydney Ringer in the early 1880s, when he determined the optimal salt concentrations to maintain the contractility of frog heart muscle tissue. Normal saline is considered a descendant of the pre-Ringer solutions, as Ringer's findings were not adopted and widely used until decades later. The term "normal saline" itself appears to have little historical basis, except for studies done in 1882–83 by Dutch physiologist Hartog Jacob Hamburger; these in vitro studies of red cell lysis suggested incorrectly that 0.9% was the concentration of salt in human blood (rather than 0.6%, the true concentration).

Normal saline has become widely used in modern medicine, but due to the mismatch with real blood, other solutions have proved better. The 2018 publication of a randomized, controlled trial with 15,000 people in intensive care units showed that compared to normal saline, lactated Ringer's solution reduced the combined risk of mortality, need for additional dialysis, or persistent kidney problems from 15% to 14%, which given the large number of patients is a significant reduction.

== Society and culture ==
Coconut water has been used in place of normal saline in areas without access to normal saline. Its use, however, has not been well studied.
