= List of abbreviations used in medical prescriptions =

This is a list of abbreviations used in medical prescriptions, including hospital orders (the patient-directed part of which is referred to as sig codes). This list does not include abbreviations for pharmaceuticals or drug name suffixes such as CD, CR, ER, XT (See Time release technology § List of abbreviations for those).

Capitalisation and the use of full stops are a matter of style. In the list, abbreviations in English are capitalized whereas those in Latin are not.

These abbreviations can be verified in reference works, both recent and older. Some of those works (such as Wyeth 1901) are so comprehensive that their entire content cannot be reproduced here. This list includes all that are frequently encountered in today's health care in English-speaking regions.

Some of these are obsolete; others remain current.

There is a risk of serious consequences when abbreviations are misread or misinterpreted. In the United Kingdom, all prescriptions should be in English without abbreviation (apart from some units such as mg and mL; micrograms and nanograms should not be abbreviated). In the United States, abbreviations which are deprecated by the Joint Commission are marked in red; those abbreviations which are deprecated by other organizations, such as the Institute for Safe Medication Practices (ISMP) and the American Medical Association (AMA), are marked in orange.

The Joint Commission is an independent, non-profit, non-governmental organization which offers accreditation to hospitals and other health care organizations in the United States. While their recommendations are not binding on U.S. physicians, they are required of organizations who wish accreditation by the Joint Commission.

== Table ==
Key
Not recommended for use in the United States by the Joint Commission
Not recommended for use by other organizations, such as the ISMP (Institute for Safe Medication Practices))

Abbreviation or symbol	Latin, Greek, or Neo-Latin	English	Possible confusion
aa, āā, ĀĀ	ana	of each	
AAA		apply to affected area	abdominal aortic aneurysm
a.c.	ante cibum	before meals	
a.c.h.s., ac&hs	ante cibum et hora somni	before meals and at bedtime	
a.d.	auris dextra	right ear	a single-storey a can be mistaken as an o which could read "o.d.", meaning right eye
ad., add.	adde addatur	add let there be added	
ad lib.	ad libitum	Latin, "at one's pleasure"; as much as one desires; freely	compare pro re nata, "as needed", which by convention includes an aspect of "up to some maximum". Similarly, compare s.o.s., q.l., and q.s.
admov.	admove admoveatur	apply [or] add add; let there be added	
ad us.	ad usum	according to custom	
æq.	æquales	equal	
agit.	agita	agitate (stir or shake)	
alt. d., alt. dieb.	alternis diebus	every other day; on alternate days	
alt. h., alt. hor.	alternis horis	every other hour; at alternate hours	
a.m.	ante meridiem	morning, before noon	
amp.	ampulla	ampule (ampul, ampoule)	
amt		amount	
aq.	aqua	water	
aq. bull.	aqua bulliens	boiling water	
aq. com.	aqua communis	common water	
aq. dest.	aqua destillata	distilled water	
aq. ferv.	aqua fervens	hot water	
a.l., a.s.	auris laeva, auris sinistra	left ear	a can be mistaken as an o which could read "o.s." or "o.l", meaning left eye
ATC		around the clock	
a.u.	auris utraque	both ears	a can be mistaken as an o which could read "o.u.", meaning both eyes
BDS, b.d.s.	bis die sumendum	twice daily	
bib.	bibe	drink	
bis	bis	twice	
b.i.d., b.d.	bis in die	twice daily	AMA style avoids use of this abbreviation (spell out "twice a day")
bis ind.	bis indies	twice a day	
bis in 7 d.	bis in septem diebus	twice a week	
BM		bowel movement	commonly used in the United Kingdom when discussing blood sugar. From BM Stix – the measurement sticks used for calculating blood sugar; BM being an abbreviation of Boehringer Mannheim.
BNF		British National Formulary	
bol.	bolus	as a large single dose (usually intravenously)	
BP, Ph.Br.	Pharmacopoeia Britannica	British Pharmacopoeia	
BS		blood sugar	
BSA		body surface area	
b.t.		bedtime	mistaken for "b.i.d", meaning twice daily
bucc.	bucca	buccal (inside cheek)	
cap., caps.	capsula	capsule	
cap.	capiat	let him take (let the patient take)	
c.m.	cras mane	tomorrow morning	
c.m.s.	cras mane sumendus	to be taken tomorrow morning	
c̄, c.	cum	with (usually written with a bar on top of the c)	
cib.	cibus	food	
c.c.	cum cibo	with food [or] cubic centimetre	mistaken for U, meaning units; also has an ambiguous meaning; use "mL" or "millilitres" (1 cm^{3} = 1 mL)
cf.	confer	compare	
c.n.	cras nocte	tomorrow night	
cochl.	cochleare	spoonful	
cochl. ampl.	cochleare amplum	an ample spoonful (a tablespoonful)	
cochl. infant.	cochleare infantis	a small spoonful (a teaspoonful)	
cochl. mag.	cochleare magnum	a large spoonful (a tablespoonful)	
cochl. mod.	cochleare modicum	a modest spoonful (a dessert-spoonful)	
cochl. parv.	cochleare parvum	a scant spoonful (a teaspoonful)	
colet.	coletur	let it be strained	
comp.	compositus	compound	
contin.	continuetur	let it be continued	
cpt.	capiat	let him take (let the patient take)	
cr., crm		cream	
CST		continue same treatment	
cuj.	cujus	of which	
c.v.	cras vespere	tomorrow evening	
cyath.	cyathus	a glassful	
cyath. vinos.	cyathus vinosus	a wine-glassful	
D, d.	die [or] dosis	days [or] doses	ambiguous meaning, write out "days" or "doses"
D5LR		dextrose 5% in lactated Ringer's solution (intravenous sugar solution)	
D5NS		dextrose 5% in normal saline (0.9%) (intravenous sugar solution)	
D5W, D_{5}W		dextrose 5% in water (intravenous sugar solution)	
D10W, D_{10}W		dextrose 10% in water (intravenous sugar solution)	
da	da	give	
DAW		dispense as written (i.e., no generic substitution)	
DC, dc, D/C, disc		discontinue [or] discharge	ambiguous meaning
decoct.	decoctum	decoction	
det.	detur	let it be given	
dieb. alt.	diebus alternis	every other day; on alternate days	
dil.		dilute	
dim.	dimidius	one-half	
d. in p. æ.	divide in partes æquales	divide into equal parts	
disp.		dispersible [or] dispense	
div.	divide	divide; let it be divided	
dL		deciliter	
DS		double strength	
d.t.d.	dentur tales doses	give of such doses	
DTO		deodorized tincture of opium	can easily be confused with "diluted tincture of opium," which is 1/25th the strength of deodorized tincture of opium; deaths have resulted due to massive morphine overdose. Compare laudanum and paregoric.
DW		distilled water [or] dextrose in water (intravenous sugar solution)	
elix.	elixir	elixir	
e.m.p.	ex modo prescripto	as directed (in the manner prescribed)	
emuls.	emulsum	emulsion	
et	et	and	
EOD		every other day	
ex aq.	ex aqua	in water; with water	
exhib.	exhibiatur	let it be given	
f.	fiat	make; let it be made	
f.h.	fiat haustus	make a draught	
fl., fld.	fluidus	fluid (usually meaning specifically liquid in health care)	
f.m.	fiat mistura	make a mixture	
f. pil.	fiat pilula	make a pill	
f.s.a.	fiat secundum artem	make according to art	
ft.	fiat	make; let it be made	
g, gm		gram (modern SI symbol is g, not gm)	
garg.	gargarisma	gargle	
gr.	granum	grain	
gtt(s)	gutta(e)	drop(s)	
gutt.	gutta(e)	drop(s)	
H		hypodermic	
h, hr, hor.	hora	hour	
habt.	habeat	let him have	
hor. alt.	hora alternis	every other hour (every second hour; at alternate hours)	
hor. decub.	hora decubitus	at bedtime	
hor. intermed.	horis intermediis	at intermediate hours	
hor. tert.	horis tertiis	every third hour	
h.s.	hora somni (at the hour of sleep)	at bedtime [or] half-strength	ambiguous (2 meanings, easily conflated); spell out
IBW		ideal body weight (for dosing based on clearance estimation)	
ID		intradermal	
IJ, inj.	injectio	injection	mistaken for "IV", meaning intravenously
i.m., IM		intramuscular	
IN		intranasal	mistaken for "IM", meaning intramuscular, or "IV", meaning intravenously
ind.	indies	daily	
inf.	infusum	infusion (extraction) / intravenous infusion	
i	unus tabuletta	one tablet	
ii	duo tabuletta	two tablets	
iii	tres tabuletta	three tablets	
IO		intraosseous	
IP		intraperitoneal	
IT		intrathecal	mistaken for other abbreviations; spell out
IU		international unit	mistaken for "IV" or "10", spell out "international unit"
i.v., IV		intravenous	
i.v.p., IVP		intravenous push	
IVPB		intravenous piggyback	
kg		kilogram	
LAS		label as such	
lat. dol.	lateri dolenti	to the painful side	
lb.	libra	pound	
l.c.d.	liquor carbonis detergens	coal tar solution	
lin	linimentum	liniment	
liq.	liquor	solution	
lot.	lotio	lotion	
M., m.	misce	mix	
M., m., mit., mitt.	mitte	send or dispense, e.g. number of tablets provided	Can be confused with m,. misce, context-dependent
mane	mane	in the morning	
max.	maximum	maximum	
mcg		microgram	recommended replacement for "μg" which may be confused with "mg"
mdi		metered dose inhaler	
m.d.u.	more dicto utendus	to be used as directed	
mEq		milliequivalent	
mg		milligram	
mg/dL		milligrams per deciliter	
MgSO4		magnesium sulfate	may be confused with "MSO4", spell out "magnesium sulfate"
midi		at midday	
min.	minimum [or] minim [or] minutum	minimum [or] minim [or] minute	
mist.	mistura	mixture	
mL		millilitre	
mod. præscript.	modo præscripto	in the manner directed	
MS		morphine sulfate or magnesium sulfate	can mean either morphine sulfate or magnesium sulfate, spell out either
MSO4		morphine sulfate	may be confused with "MgSO4", spell out "morphine sulfate"
nebul, neb.	nebula	a spray (such as for insufflation)- nebulizer	
NMT		not more than	
noct.	nocte	at night	
non rep.	non repetatur	no repeats (no refills)	
NPO, n.p.o.	nil per os	nothing by mouth	AMA style avoids use of this abbreviation (spell out "nothing by mouth")
NS		normal saline (0.9%)	
1/2NS		half-normal saline (0.45%)	
NTE		not to exceed	
o 2, o_{2}		both eyes	"O_{2}" usually means oxygen or oxygen therapy
o.d.	omni die	every day (once daily) (preferred to "qd" in the UK)	
o.d.	oculus dexter	right eye	o can be mistaken as an a which could read "a.d.", meaning right ear, confusion with "omni die"
o.m.	omni mane	every morning	
omn. bih.	omni bihora	every 2 hours	
omn. hor.	omni hora	every hour	
o.n.	omni nocte	every night	
OPD		once per day	
o.s.	oculus sinister	left eye	o can be mistaken as an a which could read "a.s.", meaning left ear
o.u.	oculus uterque	both eyes	o can be mistaken as an a which could read "a.u.", meaning both ears
oz		ounce	
p.	perstetur	continue	
part. æq.	partes æquales	equal parts	
per	per	by or through	
p.c.	post cibum	after meals	
p.c.h.s., pc&hs	post cibum et hora somni	after meals and at bedtime	
Ph.Br., BP	Pharmacopoeia Britannica	British Pharmacopoeia	
Ph.Eur.	Pharmacopoeia Europaea	European Pharmacopoeia	
Ph.Int.	Pharmacopoeia Internationalis	International Pharmacopoeia	
pig./pigm.	pigmentum	paint	
p.m.	post meridiem	evening or afternoon	
p.o.	per os	by mouth or orally	AMA style avoids use of this abbreviation (spell out "orally")
ppt.	præparata	prepared	
p.r., PR	per rectum	rectally	
p.r.n., PRN	pro re nata	as needed	PRN is pertactin, a virulence factor of the bacterium that causes pertussis
pt.	perstetur	continue	
pulv.	pulvis	powder	
p.v., PV	per vaginam	vaginally	
q	quaque	every, per	
q.1 h, q.1°	quaque 1 hora	every 1 hour (can replace 1 with other numbers)	
q4PM		at 4:00 pm (can replace 4 with other numbers)	mistaken to mean every 4 hours
q.a.d.	quaque alternis die	every other day	
q.a.m.	quaque die ante meridiem	every morning (every day before noon)	
q.d./q.1.d.	quaque die	every day	mistaken for "QOD" or "qds," AMA style avoids use of this abbreviation (spell out "every day")
q.d.a.m.	quaque die ante meridiem	once daily in the morning	
q.d.p.m.	quaque die post meridiem	once daily in the evening	
q.d.s.	quater die sumendus	4 times a day	can be mistaken for "qd" (every day)
q.p.m.	quaque die post meridiem	every evening (every day after noon)	
q.h.	quaque hora	every hour	
q.h.s.	quaque hora somni	every night at bedtime	can be mistaken as "q.h.r." (every hour)
q.i.d.	quater in die	4 times a day	can be mistaken for "qd" or "qod," AMA style avoids use of this abbreviation (spell out "4 times a day")
q.l.	quantum libet	as much as is requisite	
q.n.	quaque nocte	every night	can be mistaken as "q.h." (every hour)
q.o.d.	quaque altera die	every other day	mistaken for "QD," AMA style avoids use of this abbreviation (spell out "every other day")
q.q.	quaque	every; each	
q.q.h.	quater quaque hora	every 4 hours	
q.s.	quantum sufficiat (subjunctive), quantum sufficit (indicative), quantum satis	as much as suffices; a sufficient quantity	
q.s. a.d	add up to		
q.v.	quantum volueris [or] quod vide	at will [or] which see	
QWK		every week	
rep., rept.	repetatur	repeats	
RL, R/L		Ringer's lactate	
Rx, R_{x}, RX, ℞, Rp	recipe	take (often effectively a noun meaning "prescription"—medical prescription or prescription drug)	
rep.	repetatur	let it be repeated	
s.	signa	write (write on the label)	
s.a.	secundum artem	according to the art (accepted practice or best practice)	
SC		subcutaneous	"SC" can be mistaken for "SL," meaning sublingual. See also SQ
sem.	semen	seed	
s.i.d.	semel in die	once a day	used exclusively in veterinary medicine
sig.	signa, signetur	write (write on the label)	
s̄	sine	without (usually written with a bar on top of the s)	
sing.	singulorum	of each	
SL, s.l.	sub lingua	sublingually, under the tongue	
SOB		shortness of breath	
sol.	solutio	solution	
s.o.s., si op. sit	si opus sit	if there is a need	
s.s., SS	semisse	one-half [or] sliding scale	mistaken for "55" or "1/2"
SSI		sliding scale insulin or sliding scale regular insulin	mistaken to mean "strong solution of iodine" or "selective serotonin reuptake inhibitor". See also SSRI
SQ		subcutaneously	"SQ" can be mistaken for "5Q" meaning "5 every dose". See also SC
SSRI		selective serotonin reuptake inhibitor [or] sliding scale regular insulin	ambiguous. Do not abbreviate
st.	stet	let it stand (for example, for settling)	
stat	statim	immediately	
SubQ., subcut		subcutaneously	
sum.	sumat [or] sumendum	let him take [or] let it be taken	
supp.	suppositorium	suppository	
susp.	suspension	suspension	
syr.	syrupus	syrup	
tab.	tabella	tablet	
tal., t.	talus	such	
tbsp		tablespoon	
t.d.s., TDS	ter die sumendum	3 times a day	
t.i.d., t.d.	ter in die	3 times a day	AMA style avoids use of this abbreviation (spell out "3 times a day")
tinct.	tinctura	tincture	
t.i.w.		3 times a week	mistaken for "twice a week"
top.		topical	
TPN		total parenteral nutrition	
tr, tinc., tinct.	tinctura	tincture	
trit.	triturate	grind to a powder	
troch.	trochiscus	lozenge	
tsp		teaspoon	
U		unit	mistaken for a "4", "0" or "cc", spell out "unit"
u.d., ut. dict.	ut dictum	as directed	
ung.	unguentum	ointment	
USP		United States Pharmacopeia	
vag.	vagine	vaginally	
w		with	
w/a		while awake	
w/f		with food (with meals)	
w/o		without	
X, x		times	
YO, y.o.		years old	
μg		microgram	mistaken for "mg", meaning milligram
@		at	mistaken for "2"; spell out "at"
>		greater than	mistaken for a "7"
<		less than	mistaken for an "L"
℔	libra	pound	
℥	uncia	ounce	
ʒ	drachma	dram (drachm)	
℈	scrupulus	scruple	
°		hour	

== Currently discouraged practices ==
- Abbreviating names of drugs
- Using apothecary's units
- Using trailing zeros or not using a leading zero

== See also ==
- List of medical abbreviations
- Patient safety
