= B&O Supprettes =

Medication brand

B&O Supprettes is the brand name for a prescription medication containing powdered opium and belladonna alkaloids in a suppository form. They are indicated for the treatment of moderate to severe pain from urethral spasm, and for extending the interval(s) between injections of opiates. The drug has various "off label" uses, including renal colic, intestinal cramps, tenesmus and diarrhea. They are also often prescribed after urinary bladder surgery. B&O Supprettes was unique in the United States because they were the only drug containing opium that is for suppository use sold in the US and, in fact, one of the very few medications that contains opium in any form in the US along with paregoric and opium tincture (laudanum).

== History ==
B&O Supprettes (the name is derived from the generic term 'belladonna/opium suppository') is an "unapproved" drug according to the Food and Drug Administration (FDA) – that is, the drug existed before the Food, Drug and Cosmetic Act of 1938. Accordingly, the compound has never undergone specific medical trials, and its efficacy has never been required to be demonstrated. The FDA has put pressure on the manufacturers of this drug for this reason. The original manufacturer of the Supprettes, Eli Lilly and Company, has long since lost any patent to the drug. Amerifit, which manufactured generic Supprettes prior to 2008, was cautioned by the FDA due to the unapproved nature of the drug combination. Since 2008, Paddock Laboratories has manufactured a generic version of the Supprettes after working with the FDA on marketing issues related to the unapproved nature of the drug.

== Dosage and administration ==
The drug and its generic counterparts are supplied in packages of 12, and available in two strengths:

Each B&O Supprettes suppository #15 A contains 16.2 mg (1/4 grain) of belladonna and 30 mg (1/2 grain) of opium.

Each B&O Supprettes suppository #16 A contains 16.2 mg of belladonna and 60 mg (1 grain) of opium.

The usual dose is one suppository rectally once or twice daily PRN - (as needed), not to exceed four Supprettes in a 24-hour period.

In the United States, B&O Supprettes is a Schedule II drug under the Controlled Substances Act of 1970; a written prescription is mandatory, and no refills are permitted. Refrigerated storage is preferable, but not required. Most pharmacies consider B&O Supprettes to be a "special order" item, and as such are not normally kept in inventory. Compounding pharmacies have the capability of producing a generic form of the medication, and can modify the dosage(s) of the active ingredients (for pediatric or elderly patients, and those with chronic kidney disease) or the carrier (usually substituting cocoa butter) to best meet the needs of the patient at the request of the prescriber.
