= DPBS =

DPBS may refer to:

- Dulbecco's phosphate-buffered saline, a buffer solution used in biological research
- DPBS (CONFIG.SYS directive), a configuration directive in DOS
