= Army & Navy =

Army & Navy or Army and Navy may refer to:

- Army & Navy Stores (Canada), a department store in Vancouver and department store group in Canada
- Army & Navy Stores (United Kingdom), a department store in Victoria, London and department store group in the United Kingdom
- Army & Navy sweets, a type of British boiled sweet
- Army and Navy Club, London
- Army and Navy Club (Washington, D.C.)
- Manila Army and Navy Club, Philippines

== See also ==
- Army–Navy Game, an American college football rivalry game
- Army Navy Match, an annual British rugby union match
- Army-navy store, a type of military surplus store in the United States
