= Alsever's solution =

Alsever's solution is an citrate–dextrose solution used as an anticoagulant and preservative for red blood cells. It was introduced in 1941 by the American physician John B. Alsever and R. B. Ainslie at Syracuse, New York. Blood is mixed with an equal volume of the solution, which allows erythrocytes to be stored under refrigeration for several weeks with limited hemolysis.

During World War II, Alsever's solution was selected by the U.S. Army as the preservative for whole blood airlifted from the United States to the European Theater of Operations, beginning in August 1944. It was superseded in that role on 1 April 1945 by acid–citrate–dextrose (ACD) solution, which preserved cells longer and occupied far less space per unit of blood.

Alsever's solution is no longer used for human transfusion, having been replaced by CPD, CPDA-1 and modern additive solutions. It remains a standard laboratory reagent for collecting, storing and shipping animal erythrocytes — particularly sheep red cells — for serological and complement assays.

== Composition ==
Alsever's solution is an aqueous solution of:

Component	Concentration (w/v)
Dextrose (glucose)	2.05%
Sodium citrate	0.80%
Sodium chloride	0.42%
Citric acid	0.055%

The solution is approximately isotonic with blood plasma and mildly acidic. For use, one volume of blood is added to one volume of solution and mixed gently but thoroughly. As adopted by the U.S. Army in 1944, 500 cc of solution was used with each 500 cc of blood.
