= Geniom RT Analyzer =

Geniom RT Analyzer is an instrument used in molecular biology for diagnostic testing. The Geniom RT Analyzer utilizes the dynamic nature of tissue microRNA levels as a biomarker for disease progression. The Geniom analyzer incorporates microfluidic and biochip microarray technology in order to quantify microRNAs via a Microfluidic Primer Extension Assay (MPEA) technique (figure 2).

== Background ==
Many human diseases (e.g., cancer) are thought to be involved at a molecular level with dynamic microRNA levels. microRNAs are important in regulating gene expression and can therefore have important implications on the activation of oncogenes or the inactivation of tumour suppressor genes. Certain microRNAs have been detected at differing levels throughout the progression of particular types of cancer.

Early diagnostic testing has proved to be a challenge for many human diseases, as symptomatic phenotypes can be either ambiguous or subtle in nature. As a result, an extensive research area dedicated to the characterization of molecular biomarkers has blossomed. Biomarkers allow for the accurate measurement of biological molecules at various disease stages; these measurements will eventually contribute to an abundant data source useful for future early diagnostic testing. The Geniom RT Analyzer carries out automated microRNA biomarker profiling that will in turn contribute to this growing data source.

== The Biology ==
The detection of microRNA levels can be useful over both space and time or a combination of the two.

Spatial microRNA dynamics: Recent discoveries have shown the detection of free-floating microRNAs in blood. These free-floating microRNAs are found to be protected from endogenous RNAase activity as compared to microRNAs within the cells of tissues. This protection renders these free-floating microRNAs as suitable, stable biomarkers. This stable biomarker can be used as a control when comparing microRNA levels between tissues. Comparing microRNA levels and thus assessing expression patterns across tissues can be used in a variety of applications, such as cancer and disease classification.

Temporal microRNA dynamics: A complication with designing and developing tumour suppressor drugs for cancer patients is that the molecular environment within and around the tumour does not seem to be constant throughout the process of tumour development. MicroRNAs are one class of molecules that contribute to this environmental fluctuation for the tumour. Detecting microRNA levels in tumour or regular tissues over time can help to gain insight on the nature of these environmental changes. This information can in turn be used in deciding when the proper timing is for various therapeutic interventions.

== Work-Flow ==
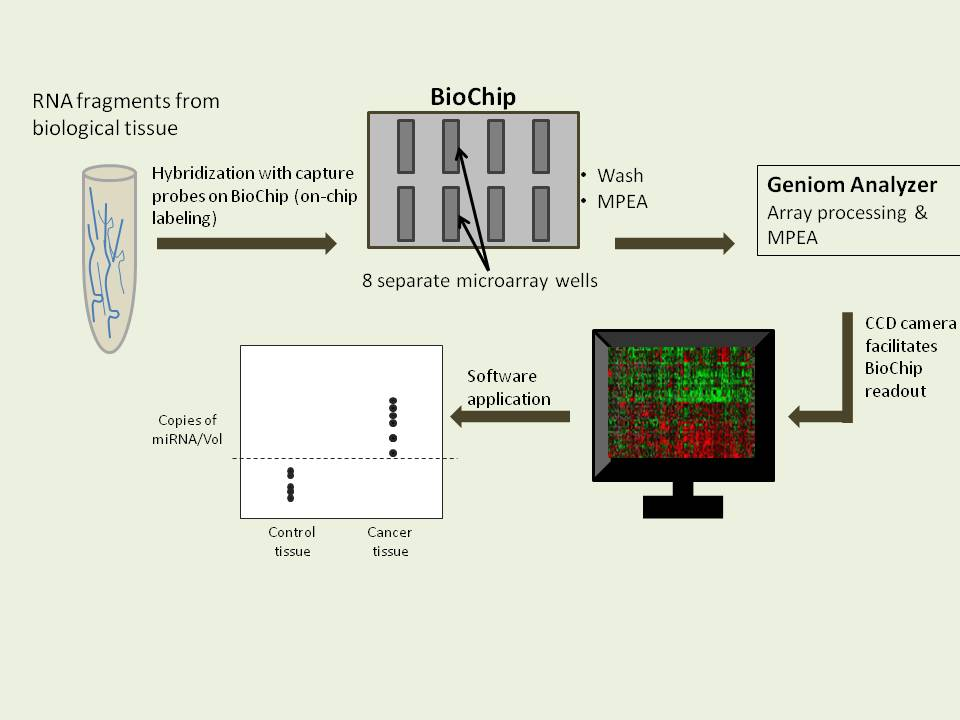
Figure 1. Work flow: from tissue to readout

The platform for the Geniom RT Analyzer consists of a biochip containing 8 separate microarrays. Tissue derived microRNAs do not require treatment prior to introduction to the biochip. The biochip contains validated and optimized customizable capture probes. The on-chip Microfluidic Primer Extension Assay (MPEA) enables direct microRNA-capture probe hybridization. After biotin labelling, primer extension and washing, the Geniom Analyzer undergoes automated processing of the arrays. A charge-coupled device (CCD) camera assists the biochip readout, which displays a pictorial image of the microRNA quantification. This image is supported by the use of biotinylated nucleotides and subsequent staining with a streptavidin-phycoerythrin conjugate. Due to the use of 8 separate microarrays per biochip, seven replicate intensity readings are made available and the median value is generally applied to the graphical results. An analysis of biomarker assessment is then made and data can be stored in the miRDBXP database.

== Innovation ==
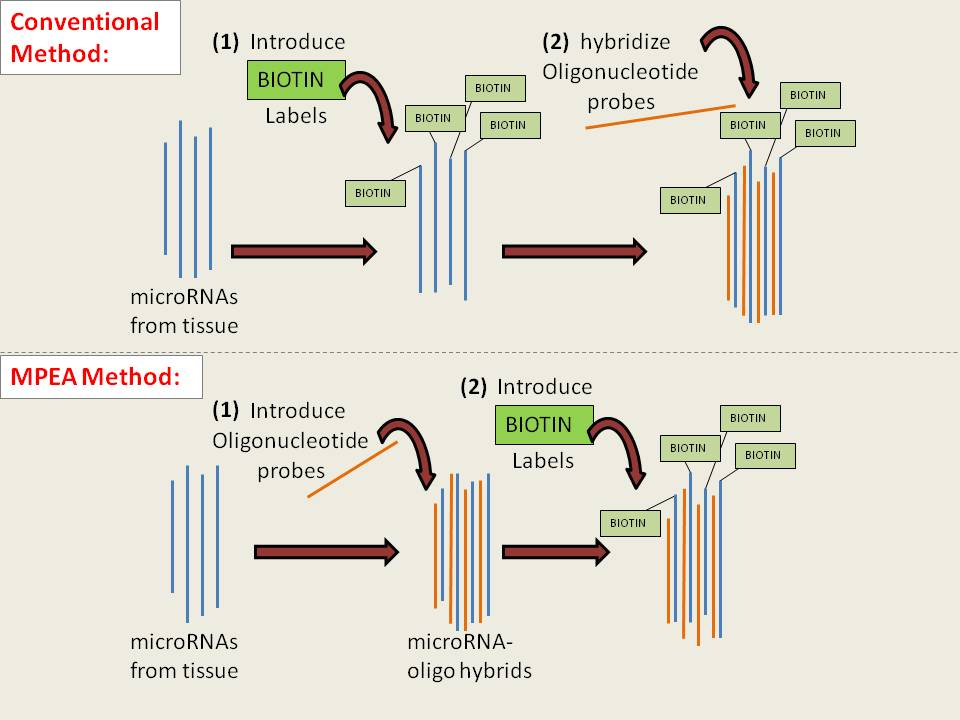
Figure 2. MPEA - Microfluidic Primer Extension Assay

MPEA: The MPEA technique utilizes microfluidic technology to ensure the correct timing and, consequently, the correct alignment of the capture probes with the microRNA molecules. Conventional methods of probe-microRNA hybridization require prior treatment of microRNAs with potentially costly reagents. These conventional methods also require initial introduction of biotin prior to hybridization. Due to the application of microfluidics, neither initial biotin nor reagent treatment is necessary prior to primer extension. Rather, the unlabeled, hybridized microRNA behaves as the primer for enzymatic elongation, a process in which biotinylated nucleotides are assembled.
