= Earle's balanced salt solution =

Isotonic saline solution

Earle's balanced salt solution is an isotonic saline solution (or balanced salt solution) formulated by W.R. Earle in 1943. It contains sodium chloride, potassium chloride, calcium chloride, magnesium sulfate, sodium dihydrogen phosphate, sodium bicarbonate and dextrose (glucose). It is intended to be used in 5% CO_{2} atmosphere. It is a base of many cell culture media.
