= Wilton R. Earle =

American cell biologist

Wilton Robinson Earle (June 22, 1902 – May 30, 1964) was an American cell biologist known for his research in cell culture techniques and carcinogenesis. Born in Greenville, South Carolina, he earned a bachelor's degree at Furman University then earned an M.A. at the University of North Carolina and PhD at Vanderbilt University in 1928. He joined the Hygienic Laboratory of the United States Public Health Service in 1928, which merged with the National Cancer Institute in 1937, where Earle worked the remainder of his life. He died at his home in Burtonsville, Maryland, aged 61.

== Career and research ==
Earle published or co-published more than one hundred scientific articles. He significantly contributed to the technology of the growth of cells in vitro. He established the first continuous cell line derived from mouse fibroblast (L-cells) and later also the first clonal cell line L929. He formulated Earle's salts, an isotonic saline solution (or balanced salt solution) with glucose and bicarbonate, which constitutes the base of many cell culture media.

== See also ==
Culture of Animal Cells: A Manual of Basic Technique and Specialized Applications, Sixth Edition

Animal-cell culture media: History, characteristics, and current issues
