= Isotonic =

The term isotonic may refer to:

- Isotonic (exercise physiology), a type of muscle contraction
- Isotone function, in mathematics
  - Isotonic regression, a type of numerical analysis
- Isotonicity, one of three types of tonicity that characterize a solution's concentration
- A sports drink that contains similar concentrations of salt and sugar to the human body
