= Paregoric =

Traditional patent medicine

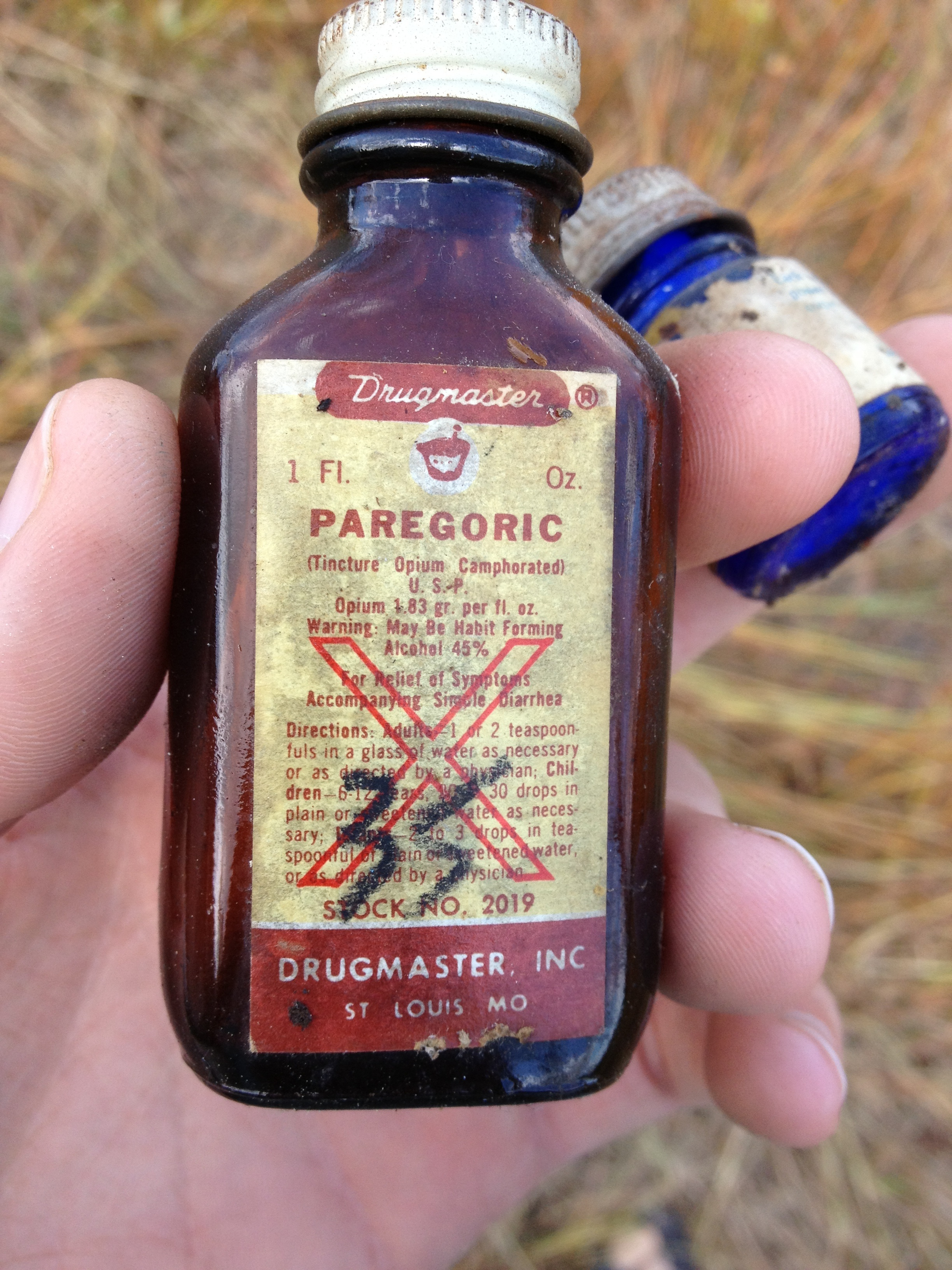
Old bottle of Paregoric, circa 1940s. The large red X on the label indicates that it was classified as an "exempt narcotic", sold without prescription even though it contains morphine.

Paregoric, or camphorated tincture of opium, also known as tinctura opii camphorata, is a patent medicine known for its antidiarrheal, antitussive, and analgesic properties. According to Goodman and Gilman's 1965 edition, "Paregoric is a 4% opium tincture in which there is also benzoic acid, camphor, and anise oil. ... Paregoric by tradition is used especially for children."

The term paregoric, which comes from Ancient Greek παρηγορικός parēgorikós "soothing", has also been used for boiled sweets which contained the substance, in particular the Army & Navy brand.

== Properties ==
In 1944, two clinicians who evaluated the expectorant action of paregoric, concluded:

The survival of paregoric through the centuries, and particularly through recent critical decades, is probably due to keen clinical observation and stubborn adherence to the clinical deduction that paregoric is useful in certain types of cough.

== History ==
In the early 18th century, Jakob Le Mort (1650–1718), a professor of chemistry at Leiden University, prepared an elixir for asthma and called it "paregoric". The word "paregoric" comes from the Greek word "paregoricon" which was originally applied to oratory – to speak, but, more accurately, talk over, soothe, and finally came to have the same meaning as "anodyne". Le Mort's elixir, consisting of "honey, licorice, flowers of Benjamin, and opium, camphor, oil of aniseed, salt of tartar and spirit of wine", appears as "Elixir Asthmaticum" in the London Pharmacopoeia of 1721. Its ingredients were assembled according to the humoral theory of the time. Paregoric was used in various formulations for hundreds of years.

Paregoric was a household remedy in the 18th and 19th centuries when it was widely used to control diarrhea in adults and children, as an expectorant and cough medicine, to calm fretful children, and to rub on the gums to counteract the pain from teething. In a memoir of life in Mississippi after the American Civil War, one woman recalled, "I wonder how any of us grew up, the drinking water of the village was so contaminated...All the family was subject to violent attacks of stomach and intestinal trouble. These were called cramp colic, cholera, morbus flux, etc., and no one ever dreamed of connecting them with the drinking supply. My father had a medicine chest filled with paregoric, Jamaica ginger and cholera mixture, which he dispersed freely."

A formula for paregoric from Dr. Chase's Recipes (1865):

Best opium 1/2 dr., dissolve it in about 2 tbsp [30 mL] of boiling water; then add benzoic acid 1/2 dr.; oil of anise 1/2 a fluid dr.; clarified honey 1 oz.; camphor gum 1 scruple; alcohol, 76 percent, 11 fluid ozs.; distilled water 4-1/2 fluid ozs.; macerate, (keep warm,) for two weeks. Dose – For children, 5 to 20 drops, adults, 1 to 2 tea-spoons.

A dram (dr.) is about 1.8 grams, a modern teaspoon is 5 mL, and a scruple is 1/4 teaspoon.

The Medical Companion, Or Family Physician, a book from 1827, gave the following recipe:

Paregoric Elixir – Take of purified opium, flowers of Benzoin, camphor, and essential oil of annis-seed, each, two drachms; brandy, two pints. Digest for eight or ten days, frequently shaking the bottle, and then strain the elixir.

== Use during the 20th century ==
During the 20th century its use declined as governments regulated its ingredients (opium is a controlled substance in many countries). Beginning in late 2011, there was a period in which paregoric was not being manufactured in the United States. As of August 2012, however, the manufacture of paregoric had resumed.

=== Regulation ===
The early 20th century brought increased regulation of all manner of narcotics, including paregoric, as the addictive properties of opium became more widely understood, and "patent medicines came under fire largely because of their mysterious compositions". In the United States, the Pure Food and Drug Act of 1906 required that certain specified drugs, including alcohol, cocaine, heroin, morphine, and cannabis, be accurately labeled with contents and dosage. Previously many drugs had been sold as patent medicines with secret ingredients or misleading labels. Cocaine, heroin, cannabis, and other such drugs continued to be legally available without prescription as long as they were labeled. It is estimated that sale of patent medicines containing opiates decreased by 33% after labeling was mandated. In 1906 in Britain and in 1908 in Canada laws requiring disclosure of ingredients and limitation of narcotic content were instituted.

The U.S. Harrison Narcotics Tax Act of 1914 restricted the manufacture and distribution of opiates, including laudanum and coca derivatives; this was followed by France's Loi des stupefiants in 1916 and Britain's Dangerous Drugs Act in 1920. The Harrison Narcotics Tax Act regulated "opium or coca leaves, or any compound, manufacture, salt, derivative or preparation thereof", but not some medical products containing relatively low concentrations of these substances. Paregoric was classified as an "Exempt Narcotic", as were other medical products containing small amounts of opium or their derivatives.

== Regulation and use since 1970 ==
Until 1970, paregoric could be purchased in the United States at a pharmacy without a medical prescription, in accordance with federal law. Federal law dictated that no more than two ounces of paregoric be dispensed by any pharmacy to the same purchaser within a 48-hour period. Purchasers were also required to sign a register or logbook, and pharmacies were technically required to request identification from any purchaser not personally known to the pharmacist. Some states further limited the sale of paregoric or banned over-the-counter sales entirely. For example, Michigan law disallowed over-the-counter (OTC) sale of paregoric in April 1964 but still allowed OTC sales of certain exempt cough medication preparations that contain 60 mg of codeine per fluid ounce. Even where legally permissible by law, OTC sale of paregoric was subject to the discretion of individual pharmacists.

In 1970, paregoric was classified as a Schedule III drug under the Controlled Substances Act; however, drugs that contained a mixture of kaolin, pectin, and paregoric (e.g., Donnagel-PG, Parepectolin, and their generic equivalents) were classified as Schedule V drugs. They were available over-the-counter without a prescription in many states until the early 1990s, at which time the FDA banned the sale of anti-diarrheal drugs containing kaolin and pectin; also, Donnagel-PG contained tincture of belladonna, which became prescription-only on January 1, 1993. Paregoric is currently listed in the United States Pharmacopeia. Manufacture of the drug was discontinued for several months beginning in late 2011; however, production and distribution resumed in 2012, so the drug is still available in the United States by prescription. Thus, it is unclear as to whether the lapse in manufacture actually resulted in a shortage of the drug at any time, since prescription drugs are often still available for many months after manufacture has been discontinued. In France, paregoric was available without prescription until 1986; nowadays, it is used to wean infants born to opiate-addicted women.

== Paregoric, U.S.P. formula ==
The principal active ingredient in paregoric is powdered opium. In the United States the formula for Paregoric U.S.P. is a tincture of opium 40 mL, anise oil 4 mL, benzoic acid 4 g, camphor 4 g, glycerin 40 mL, alcohol 450 mL, purified water 450 mL, diluted with alcohol to 1000 mL, and contains the equivalent of 0.4 mg/mL of anhydrous morphine; one ounce of paregoric contains 129.6 mg (2 grains) of powdered opium, or the equivalent of 13 mg of anhydrous morphine. The average adult dose is 4 mL by mouth which corresponds to 16 mg of opium, or 1.6 mg of anhydrous morphine.

It is unclear when the current formula for Paregoric, U.S.P. was developed in the United States. One formula for "Camphorated Tincture of Opium (Paregoric Elixir)" attributed to the United States Pharmacoepia of 1863 is: "Macerate 1 drachm each powdered opium and benzoic acid, 1 fluid drachm of anise, 2 ounces clarified honey, and 2 scruples camphor, in 2 pints diluted alcohol for 7 days, and filter through paper." A slightly different formula is given in the 1926 pharmacoepia.

The current formula for Paregoric, U.S.P. should not be assumed to be universal. For example, in the United Kingdom the formula for Paregoric, B.P. is tincture of opium 5 mL, benzoic acid 500 mg, camphor 300 mg, anise oil 0.3 mL, alcohol (60%) to 100 mL, and contains about 1/30th grain of anhydrous morphine in 60 minims, which is 25% stronger than Paregoric, U.S.P.

== Dosage ==
Paregoric is sometimes confused with laudanum because their chemical names are similar: camphorated tincture of opium (paregoric) vs. tincture of opium (laudanum). However, laudanum contains 10 milligrams of morphine per milliliter, 25 times more than paregoric. Confusion between the two drugs has led to overdose and death in patients. Thus the term "paregoric" should be used instead of "camphorated opium tincture", since the latter may be confused with laudanum.

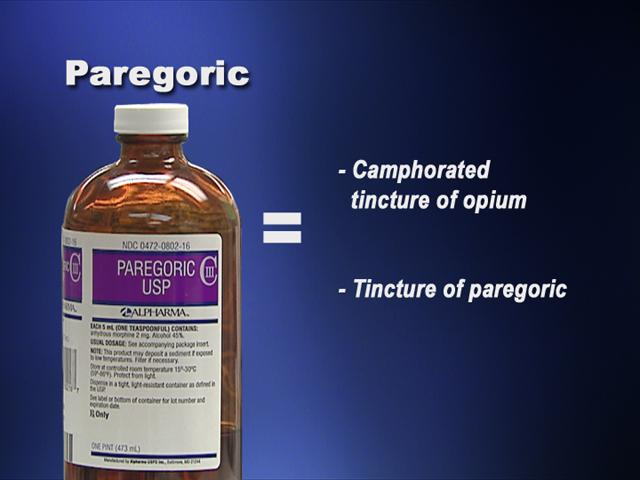
Bottle of Paregoric

The differences between laudanum and paregoric are important and should be kept in mind when administering either of these drugs. Care and caution should always be taken in administering doses of tincture of opium, such as the use of a dosage syringe or other suitable measurement device, and by pharmacists in preparing paregoric from laudanum, and to note that the dosages noted here refer to apothecaries weight and fluid measure. In particular, "the difference between a minim and a drop should be borne in mind when figuring doses. A minim is always a sixtieth part of a fluid drachm regardless of the character of the substance, while a drop varies from a forty-fifth to a two-hundred-and-fiftieth part, according to the surface tension of the fluid." Laudanum and paregoric each have 50.9 drops per gram; 50.0 drops per cc; 185.0 drops per fluid drachm; and 3.10 drops per minim." The importance of these distinctions is evident in view of the dangers of erroneously relying upon more general descriptions of apothecaries' fluid measures, which typically list 60 minims per fluid dram, and 8 fluid drams per fluid ounce (480 minims).

== Indications ==
The main effects of paregoric are to increase the muscular tone of the intestine, to inhibit normal peristalsis, and as an expectorant; a peer-reviewed clinical study in 1944 reported "that all of [its] ingredients have been found to contribute toward the expectorant action of paregoric, and, further, that an advantage is contained in the combination over the sum of the effects of the individual constituents," that Paregoric "is expectorant by virtue of a reflex from the stomach," and "preparations of paregoric which have aged for two or three years are superior as an expectorant to preparations aged for less time.". Its main medical use is to control fulminant diarrhea, and as an antitussive (cough suppressant). Problems with its use include opiate dependency and analgesia which can mask symptoms of diseases that need treatment.

However, paregoric was characterized as "a needlessly complex pharmacopeial mixture... of a former day" by a 1966 study. In the 21st century its two main uses have been largely supplanted by minimally psychoactive cough-suppressant drugs (such as dextromethorphan) and non-psychoactive antidiarrheal drugs (such as loperamide).

== In fiction ==
Her voice chilled. "Now I'm sick of you. Sick of you." She took a wineglass from the table, went to the bureau, and poured paregoric until the glass was half full. "Here, Mother, drink it. It will be good for you."

John Steinbeck, East of Eden
