= Phosphate-buffered saline =

Buffer solution commonly used in biological research

Phosphate-buffered saline (PBS) is a buffer solution (pH ~ 7.4) commonly used in biological research. It is a water-based salt solution containing disodium hydrogen phosphate, sodium chloride and, in some formulations, potassium chloride and potassium dihydrogen phosphate. The buffer helps to maintain a constant pH. The osmolarity and ion concentrations of the solutions are isotonic, meaning they match those of the human body.

== Applications ==
PBS has many uses because it is isotonic and non-toxic to most cells. These uses include substance dilution and cell container rinsing. PBS with EDTA is also used to disengage attached and clumped cells. Divalent metals such as zinc, however, cannot be added as this will result in precipitation. For these types of applications, Good's buffers are recommended. PBS has been shown to be an acceptable alternative to viral transport medium regarding transport and storage of RNA viruses, such as SARS-CoV-2, as well as for long-term storage of plasmid DNA.

== Preparation ==
There are many different ways to prepare PBS solutions, common ones are Dulbecco's phosphate-buffered saline (DPBS) and the Cold Spring Harbor protocol. Some formulations of DPBS do not contain potassium and magnesium, while other ones contain calcium and/or magnesium (depending on whether or not the buffer is used on live or fixed tissue: the latter does not require CaCl_{2} or MgCl_{2} ).

DPBS 1x, no calcium, no magnesium
Salt	Concentration (mmol/L)	Concentration (g/L)
Na_{2}HPO_{4}	8.1	1.15
KH_{2}PO_{4}	1.5	0.2
NaCl	137	8.0
KCl	2.7	0.2

DPBS 1x, calcium, magnesium
Salt	Concentration (mmol/L)	Concentration (g/L)
Na_{2}HPO_{4}	8.1	1.15
KH_{2}PO_{4}	1.5	0.2
NaCl	137	8.0
KCl	2.7	0.2
CaCl_{2}	0.9	0.1
MgCl_{2}	0.5	0.1

Cold Spring Harbor Protocol
reagent	MW	mass (g) 10×	[mM] 10×	mass (g) 5×	[mM] 5×	mass (g) 1×	[mM] 1×
Na_{2}HPO_{4}	141.95897	14.1960	100	7.0980	50	1.41960	10
KH_{2}PO_{4}	136.08569	2.4496	18	1.2248	9	0.24496	1.8
NaCl	58.44300	80.0669	1370	40.0335	685	8.00669	137
KCl	74.55150	2.0129	27	1.0064	13.5	0.20129	2.7
pH = 7.4

Start with 800 mL of distilled water to dissolve all salts. Add distilled water to a total volume of 1 liter. The resultant 1× PBS will have a final concentration of 157 mM Na^{+}, 140 mM Cl^{−}, 4.45 mM K^{+}, 10.1 mM HPO_{4}^{2−}, 1.76 mM H_{2}PO_{4}^{−} and a pH of 7.96. Add 2.84 mM of HCl to shift the buffer to 7.3 mM HPO_{4}^{2−} and 4.6 mM H_{2}PO_{4}^{−} for a final pH of 7.4 and a Cl^{−} concentration of 142 mM.

The pH of PBS is ~7.4. When making buffer solutions, it is good practice to always measure the pH directly using a pH meter. If necessary, pH can be adjusted using hydrochloric acid or sodium hydroxide.

PBS can also be prepared by using commercially made PBS buffer tablets or pouches.

If used in cell culturing, the solution can be dispensed into aliquots and sterilized by autoclaving or filtration. Sterilization may not be necessary depending on its use. PBS can be stored at room temperature or in the refrigerator. However, concentrated stock solutions may precipitate when cooled and should be kept at room temperature until precipitate has completely dissolved before use.

== Dependence of pH on ionic strength and temperature ==
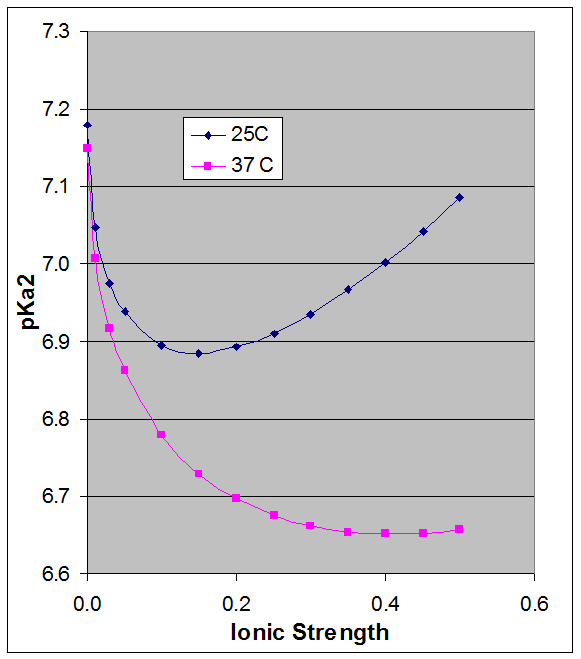
Dependence of pK_{a2} of phosphate buffer on ionic strength and temperature

The Henderson–Hasselbalch equation gives the pH of a solution relative to the pK_{a} of the acid–base pair. However the pK_{a} is dependent on ionic strength and temperature, and as it shifts so will the pH of a solution based on that acid–base pair. Because the doubly charged HPO_{4}^{2−} is stabilized more by high ionic strength than is the singly-charged H_{2}PO_{4}^{−}, their pK_{a} is somewhat dependent on ionic strength. The often-cited pK_{a} of ~7.2 is the value extrapolated to zero ionic strength, and is not applicable at physiological ionic strength.

Phillips et al. measured the pK_{a} at 10, 25, and 37 °C at various ionic strengths. For the latter two temperatures they report pK_{a} in Debye-Hückel equations (plotted in the accompanying figure for μ up to 0.5 M):
at 25 °C: pK_{a2} = 7.18 − 1.52 sqrt(μ) + 1.96 μ
at 37 °C: pK_{a2} = 7.15 − 1.56 sqrt(μ) + 1.22 μ

The pK_{a}^{0} is weakly dependent on temperature. Phillips et al. reported ∆H^{0} at 25 °C of 760 cal/mol (3180 J/mol) and a linear dependence of pK_{a}^{0} on 1/T (Van 't Hoff equation). The positive ∆H^{0} results in an increase in K_{a}, and thus a decrease in pK_{a}^{0} with rising temperature, the change in pK_{a}^{0} being 166 × the change in (1/T), which around 25 °C results in a change in pK_{a}^{0} of −0.00187 per degree. This applies strictly to the extrapolated thermodynamic pK_{a}^{0} at infinite dilution, and as the figure shows, the temperature effect can be much larger at higher ionic strength.

== See also ==
- Borate-buffered saline
- Tris-buffered saline
- Brine
