= Mass concentration (chemistry) =

Chemical term for density of a component in a mixture

In chemistry, the mass concentration ρ_{i} (or γ_{i}) is defined as the mass of a constituent m_{i} divided by the volume of the mixture V.

$$\rho_i = \frac {m_i}{V}$$

For a pure chemical substance, the mass concentration equals its density (mass divided by volume); thus the mass concentration of a component in a mixture can be called the "density of a component in a mixture". This explains the usage of ρ (the lower case Greek letter rho), the symbol most often used for density.

== Definition and properties ==
The volume V in the definition refers to the volume of the solution, not the volume of the solvent. One litre of a solution usually contains either slightly more or slightly less than 1 litre of solvent because the process of dissolution causes volume of liquid to increase or decrease. Sometimes the mass concentration is called titre.

=== Notation ===
The notation common with mass density underlines the connection between the two quantities (the mass concentration being the mass density of a component in the solution), but it can be a source of confusion especially when they appear in the same formula undifferentiated by an additional symbol (like a star superscript, a bolded symbol or varrho).

=== Dependence on volume ===
Mass concentration depends on the variation of the volume of the solution due mainly to thermal expansion. On small intervals of temperature the dependence is:

$$\rho_i = \frac{\rho_{i\left(T_0\right)}}{1 + \alpha \Delta T}$$

where ρ_{i(T_{0})} is the mass concentration at a reference temperature, α is the thermal expansion coefficient of the mixture.

=== Sum of mass concentrations - normalizing relation ===
The sum of the mass concentrations of all components (including the solvent) gives the density ρ of the solution:

$$\rho = \sum_i \rho_i \,$$

Thus, for pure component the mass concentration equals the density of the pure component.

== Units ==
The SI-unit for mass concentration is kg/m^{3} (kilogram/cubic metre). This is the same as mg/mL and g/L. Another commonly used unit is g/(100 mL), which is identical to g/dL (gram/decilitre).

=== Usage in biology ===
In biology and medicine, the "%" symbol is widely used in a misnomer sense to denote mass concentration, also called "mass/volume percentage". A solution with 1 g of solute dissolved in a final volume of 100 mL of solution would be labeled as "1%" or "1% m/v" (mass/volume). The common names of intravenous sugar solutions, such as D5W and D50W, reflect this convention. The notation is mathematically flawed because the unit "%" can only be used for dimensionless quantities. "Percent solution" or "percentage solution" are thus terms best reserved for "mass percent solutions" (m/m = m% = mass solute/mass total solution after mixing), or "volume percent solutions" (v/v = v% = volume solute per volume of total solution after mixing). The very ambiguous terms "percent solution" and "percentage solutions" with no other qualifiers, continue to occasionally be encountered.

This common usage of % to mean m/v in biology is because of many biological solutions being dilute and water-based, an aqueous solution. Liquid water has a density of approximately 1 g/cm^{3} (1 g/mL). Thus 100 mL of water is equal to approximately 100 g. Therefore, a solution with 1 g of solute dissolved in final volume of 100 mL aqueous solution may also be considered 1% m/m (1 g solute in 99 g water). This approximation breaks down as the solute concentration is increased (for example, in water–NaCl mixtures). High solute concentrations are often not physiologically relevant, but are occasionally encountered in pharmacology, where the mass per volume notation is still sometimes encountered. An extreme example is saturated solution of potassium iodide (SSKI) which attains 100 "%" m/v potassium iodide mass concentration (1 gram KI per 1 mL solution) only because the solubility of the dense salt KI is extremely high in water, and the resulting solution is very dense (1.72 times as dense as water).

Although there are examples to the contrary, it should be stressed that the commonly used "units" of % w/v are grams per millilitre (g/mL). 1% m/v solutions are sometimes thought of as being gram/100 mL but this detracts from the fact that % m/v is g/mL; 1 g of water has a volume of approximately 1 mL (at standard temperature and pressure) and the mass concentration is said to be 100%. To make 10 mL of an aqueous 1% cholate solution, 0.1 grams of cholate are dissolved in 10 mL of water. Volumetric flasks are the most appropriate piece of glassware for this procedure as deviations from ideal solution behavior can occur with high solute concentrations.

In solutions, mass concentration is commonly encountered as the ratio of mass/[volume solution], or m/v. In water solutions containing relatively small quantities of dissolved solute (as in biology), such figures may be "percentivized" by multiplying by 100 a ratio of grams solute per mL solution. The result is given as "mass/volume percentage". Such a convention expresses mass concentration of 1 gram of solute in 100 mL of solution, as "1 m/v %".

== Related quantities ==
=== Density of pure component ===
The relation between mass concentration and density of a pure component (mass concentration of single component mixtures) is:

$$\rho_i = \rho_i^* \frac{V_i}{V}\,$$

where ρ^{∗}_{i} is the density of the pure component, V_{i} the volume of the pure component before mixing.

=== Specific volume (or mass-specific volume) ===
Specific volume is the inverse of mass concentration only in the case of pure substances, for which mass concentration is the same as the density of the pure-substance:

$$\nu = \frac{V}{m}\ = \frac{1}{\rho}$$

=== Molar concentration ===
The conversion to molar concentration c_{i} is given by:

$$c_i = \frac{\rho_i}{M_i}$$

where M_{i} is the molar mass of constituent i.

=== Mass fraction ===
The conversion to mass fraction w_{i} is given by:

$$w_i = \frac{\rho_i}{\rho}$$

=== Mole fraction ===
The conversion to mole fraction x_{i} is given by:

$$x_i = \frac{\rho_i}{\rho} \frac{M}{M_i}$$

where M is the average molar mass of the mixture.

=== Molality ===
For binary mixtures, the conversion to molality b_{i} is given by:

$$b_i = \frac{\rho_i}{M_i (\rho - \rho_i)}$$

== Spatial variation and gradient ==
The values of (mass and molar) concentration different in space triggers the phenomenon of diffusion.
