= Pro re nata =

Term used in medicine to mean "as needed"

Pro re nata is a Latin phrase meaning "in the circumstances" or "as the circumstance arises" (literally "for the thing born"). In medical terminology, it is often abbreviated PRN or P.R.N. and refers to the administration of prescribed medication as the situation calls for it.

== Medical terminology ==
Generally abbreviated to "P.R.N." or "PRN", pro re nata refers to the administration of prescribed medication whose timing is left to the patient (in the case of patient-controlled analgesia), nurse, or caregiver, as opposed to medication that is taken according to a fixed (primarily daily) schedule (a.k.a. "scheduled dosage"). Pro re nata does not imply that the patient may take as much of the medicine as desired, but rather that the medicine may be taken in the prescribed dosage if needed. Such administration of medication is not meant to imply, and should never allow for, exceeding a maximum daily dosage. This aspect of "only if needed, and only up to some maximum" differentiates pro re nata dosages (which are common) from ad libitum dosages (which are not common).

== Nursing ==
PRN can also refer to nurses who work on an as-needed basis rather than on a regular schedule. Nurses working on this basis are called PRN nurses.

== See also ==
- List of abbreviations used in medical prescriptions
- Treat and extend
