= Hanks' salts =

Hanks' salts is a collective group of salts rich in bicarbonate ions, formulated in 1940 by the microbiologist John H. Hanks. Typically, they are used as a buffer system in cell culture media and aid in maintaining the optimum physiological pH (roughly 7.0–7.4) for cellular growth. Due to their poorly reactive nature and small concentration in solution, Hanks' salts are mainly used in media that are exposed to atmospheric conditions as opposed to CO_{2} incubation. Performing the latter drastically exceeds the buffer capacity of Hanks' salts and may result in cell death.

The recipe according to AATBIO

Table 1. Required components

Component	Amount	Concentration
NaCl (mw: 58.44 g/mol)	8 g	0.14 M
KCl (mw: 74.55 g/mol)	400 mg	0.005 M
CaCl_{2} (mw: 110.98 g/mol)	140 mg	0.001 M
MgSO_{4}-7H_{2}O (mw: 246.47 g/mol)	100 mg	0.0004 M
MgCl_{2}-6H_{2}O (mw: 203.303 g/mol)	100 mg	0.0005 M
Na_{2}HPO_{4}-2H_{2}O (mw: 177.99 g/mol)	60 mg	0.0003 M
KH_{2}PO_{4} (mw: 136.086 g/mol)	60 mg	0.0004 M
D-Glucose (Dextrose) (mw: 180.156 g/mol)	1 g	0.006 M
NaHCO_{3} (mw: 84.01 g/mol)	350 mg	0.004 M

1. Prepare 800 mL of distilled water in a suitable container.
2. Add 8 g of NaCl to the solution.
3. Add 400 mg of KCl to the solution.
4. Add 140 mg of CaCl_{2} to the solution.
5. Add 100 mg of MgSO_{4}-7H_{2}O to the solution.
6. Add 100 mg of MgCl_{2}-6H_{2}O to the solution.
7. Add 60 mg of Na_{2}HPO_{4}-2H_{2}O to the solution.
8. Add 60 mg of KH_{2}PO_{4} to the solution.
9. Add 1 g of D-Glucose (Dextrose) to the solution.
10. Add 350 mg of NaHCO_{3} to the solution.
11. Add distilled water until volume is 1 L.
