= Intravenous sugar solution =

Dextrose solution used to treat low blood sugar

- Chemical structure of dextrose

Clinical data
- Other names: dextrose solution, glucose solution
- AHFS/Drugs.com: Monograph
- License data: US DailyMed: Dextrose_solution
- Routes of administration: Intravenous
- ATC code: B05BA03 (WHO)

Identifiers
- ChemSpider: none
- UNII: 5SL0G7R0OK

Chemical and physical data
- Formula: C6H12O6

Intravenous sugar solution, also known as dextrose solution, is a mixture of dextrose (glucose) and water. It is used to treat low blood sugar or water loss without electrolyte loss. Water loss without electrolyte loss may occur in fever, hyperthyroidism, high blood calcium, or diabetes insipidus. It is also used in the treatment of high blood potassium, diabetic ketoacidosis, and as part of parenteral nutrition. It is given by injection into a vein.

Side effects may include irritation of the vein in which it is given, high blood sugar, and swelling. Excess use may result in low blood sodium and other electrolyte problems. Intravenous sugar solutions are in the crystalloid family of medications. They come in a number of strengths including 5%, 10%, and 50% dextrose. While they may start out hypertonic they become hypotonic solutions as the sugar is metabolised. Versions are also available mixed with saline.

Dextrose solutions for medical use became available in the 1920s and 1930s. It is on the World Health Organization's List of Essential Medicines.

== Medical uses ==
Administering a 5% sugar solution peri- and postoperatively usually achieves a good balance between starvation reactions and hyperglycemia caused by sympathetic activation. A 10% solution may be more appropriate when the stress response from the reaction has decreased, after approximately one day after surgery. After more than approximately two days, a more complete regimen of total parenteral nutrition is indicated.

In patients with hypernatremia and euvolemia, free water can be replaced using either 5% D/W or 0.45% saline.

In patients with fatty-acid metabolism disorder (FOD), 10% solution may be appropriate upon arrival to the emergency room.

== Side effects ==
Intravenous glucose is used in some Asian countries as a pick-me-up, for "energy", but is not part of routine medical care in the United States where glucose solution is a prescription drug. Asian immigrants to the United States are at risk of infection if they seek intravenous glucose treatment. It may be had at storefront clinics catering to Asian immigrants, despite having no more effect than drinking sugared water. The procedure is commonly called "ringer".

Concentrated dextrose solutions should not be administered subcutaneously or intramuscularly, as they can cause cell death via dehydration and subsequent necrosis.

== Types ==
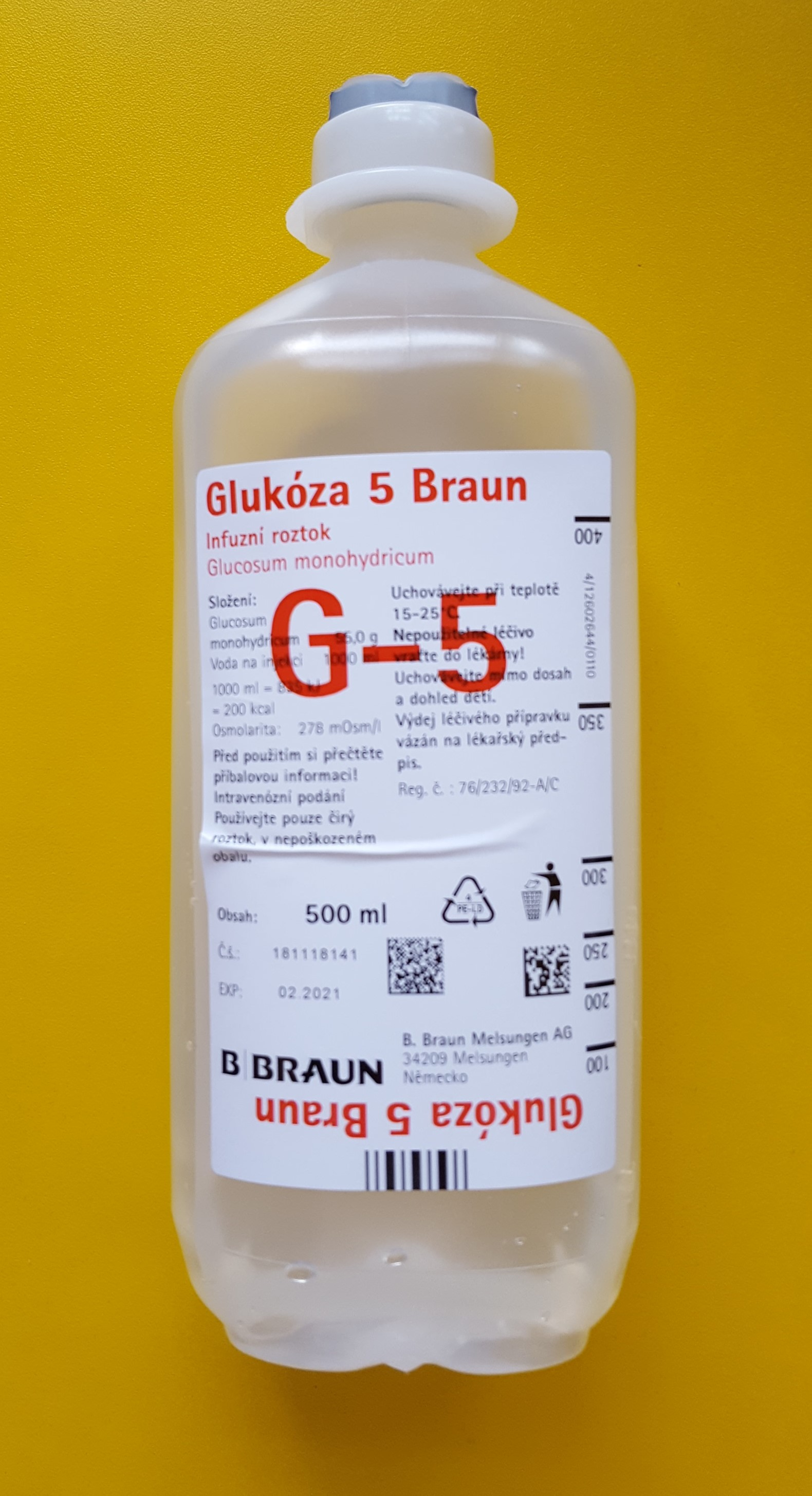
5% glucose in water

Types of glucose/dextrose include:

- D5W (5% dextrose in water), which consists of 278 mmol/L dextrose
- D5NS (5% dextrose in normal saline), which, in addition, contains normal saline (0.9% w/v of NaCl).
  - D5 1/2NS 5% dextrose in half amount of normal saline (0.45% w/v of NaCl).
- D5LR (5% dextrose in lactated Ringer solution)
- D50 – 50% dextrose in water

The percentage is a mass concentration, so a 5% glucose/dextrose solution contains 50 g/L of glucose/dextrose (5 g per 100 ml). This usage is imprecise but widely used, as discussed at Mass concentration (chemistry) § Usage in biology.

Glucose provides energy 4 kcal/gram, so a 5% glucose solution provides 0.2 kcal/ml. If prepared from dextrose monohydrate, which provides 3.4 kcal/gram, a 5% solution provides 0.17 kcal/ml.
