= Borate buffered saline =

Borate buffered saline (abbreviated BBS) is a buffer used in some biochemical techniques to maintain the pH within a relatively narrow range. Borate buffers have an alkaline buffering capacity in the 8–10 range. Boric acid has a pK_{a} of 9.14 at 25 °C.

== Applications ==
BBS has many uses because it is isotonic and has a strong bactericidal effect. It can be used to dilute substances and has applications in coating procedures. Additives such as Polysorbate 20 and milk powder can be used to add to BBS's functionality as a washing buffer or blocking buffer.

== Contents ==
The following is a sample recipe for BBS:

- 10 mM Sodium borate
- 150 mM NaCl

Adjust pH to pH 8.2

The simplest way to prepare a BBS solution is to use BBS tablets. They are formulated to give a ready to use borate buffered saline solution upon dissolution in 500 ml of deionized water.

Concentration of borate and NaCl as well as the pH can vary, and the resulting solution would still be referred to as "borate buffered saline". Borate concentration (giving buffering capacity) can vary from 10 mM to 100 mM. As BBS is used to emulate physiological conditions (as in animal or human body), the pH value is slightly alkaline, ranging from 8.0 to 9.0. NaCl gives the isotonic (mostly used 150 mM NaCl corresponds to physiological conditions: 0.9 % NaCl) salt concentration.
