= Army & Navy sweets =

Traditional boiled sweet

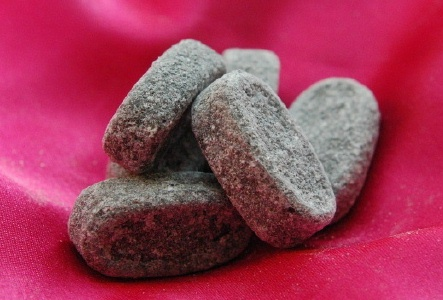
Army & Navy sweets

Army & Navy sweets are a type of traditional boiled sweet, or hard candy, available in the United Kingdom. They are black in colour, lozenge-shaped and flavoured with liquorice and herbs. They are often eaten in winter as their slightly medicinal flavour is similar to that of Cough candy. Their name is likely derived from their popularity with service personnel during the First World War. Originally they are reported to have contained Opium.

== See also ==
- Liquorice (confectionery)
- Aniseed twist
