= Tris-buffered saline =

Buffer solution used in biochemistry

Tris-buffered saline (TBS) is a buffer solution used in some biochemical techniques to maintain the pH within a relatively narrow range. Tris (as the hydrochloride salt) has a slightly alkaline buffering capacity in the 7–9.2 range. The conjugate acid of Tris has a pK_{a} of 8.07 at 25 °C. The pK_{a} declines approximately 0.03 units per degree Celsius rise in temperature. This can lead to relatively dramatic pH shifts when there are shifts in solution temperature. Sodium chloride concentration may vary from 100 to 200 mM, tris concentration from 5 to 100 mM and pH from 7.2 to 8.0. A common formulation of TBS is 150 mM NaCl, 50 mM Tris-HCl, pH 7.6. TBS can also be prepared by using commercially made TBS buffer tablets or pouches.

== Applications ==
TBS is isotonic and non-toxic. It can be used to dilute substances used in laboratory experiments. Additives can be used to add to a compound's functionality.

TBS is often used in immuno-blotting for both membrane washing and antibody dilution.
