= Military anti-shock trousers =

Medical device to treat blood loss

Military anti-shock trousers (MAST), or pneumatic anti-shock garments (PASG), are medical devices used to treat severe blood loss. The device is usually applied to the patient's pelvis, abdomen, and lower parts of the body and is composed of inflatable air bladders. The device is designed to transfer blood away from the above described body parts and into the upper body by applying pressure.

There is significant controversy over the use of MAST. Initial studies in the 1970s suggested that the application of MAST auto-transfused up to 20 percent of the patient's blood to the upper body. However, by using human and dog models, subsequent studies in the 1980s disputed the claim, showing that lower than 5 percent of the blood was actually auto-transfused with the device. In addition, the usage of the device may cause further complications such as compartment syndrome and lower extremity ischemia. Most modern EMS and trauma programs have abandoned their use following data from a Cochrane review which indicated no mortality or survival benefit when MAST were applied to patients in shock.

I. G. Roberts et al. sought to quantify the effect on mortality and morbidity of the use of MAST in patients following trauma, and published the data in the Cochrane Database of Systematic Reviews.

== See also ==
- Compression garment
- Hemostasis
- Hypovolemia
- Permissive hypotension
- Shock (circulatory)
