= Hypovolemic shock =

Medical emergency due to low blood volume

- A diagram showing the formation of interstitial fluid from the bloodstream
- Specialty: Emergency medicine
- Symptoms: Anxiety, confusion, decreased or no urine output, cool and clammy skin, sweating, weakness, pallor, rapid breathing, unconsciousness
- Causes: Severe dehydration or blood loss
- Treatment: Replacement of fluids, surgery to repair cause of bleeding

Hypovolemic shock is a form of shock caused by severe hypovolemia (insufficient blood volume or fluid outside of cells in the body). It can be caused by severe dehydration or blood loss. Hypovolemic shock is a medical emergency; if left untreated, the insufficient blood flow can cause damage to organs, leading to multiple organ failures.

In treating hypovolemic shock, it is important to determine the cause of the underlying hypovolemia, which may be the result of bleeding or other fluid loss. To minimize damage to tissues from insufficient blood flow, treatment involves quickly replacing lost blood or fluids, with consideration of both rate and the type of fluids used.

Tachycardia, a fast heart rate, is typically the first abnormal vital sign. When resulting from blood loss, trauma is the most common root cause, but severe blood loss can also happen in various body systems without clear traumatic injury. The body in hypovolemic shock prioritizes getting oxygen to the brain and heart, which reduces blood flow to nonvital organs and the limbs, causing them to grow cold, look mottled, and exhibit delayed capillary refill. The lack of adequate oxygen delivery causes the blood to become more acidic (acidosis). The "lethal triad" of ways trauma can lead to death is acidosis, hypothermia, and coagulopathy. It is possible for trauma to cause clotting problems even without resuscitation efforts.

Damage control resuscitation is based on three principles:

- permissive hypotension: tries to balance temporary suboptimal perfusion to organs with conditions for halting blood loss by setting a goal of 90 mmHg systolic blood pressure
- hemostatic resuscitation: restoring blood volume in ways (with whole blood or equivalent) that interfere minimally with the natural process of stopping bleeding.
- damage control surgery.

== Signs and symptoms ==
Symptoms of hypovolemic shock can be related to volume depletion, electrolyte imbalances, or acid–base disorders that accompany the condition.

Patients with volume depletion may complain of thirst, muscle cramps, and/or orthostatic hypotension. Severe hypovolemic shock can result in insufficient blood flow to the heart and to the mesentery in the abdomen, which can cause or chest pain or abdominal pain. Agitation, lethargy, or confusion may characterize brain mal-perfusion.

Dry mucous membranes, decreased skin turgor, low jugular venous distention, tachycardia, and hypotension can be seen along with decreased urinary output. Patients in shock can appear cold, clammy, and cyanotic.

Early signs and symptoms include tachycardia given rise to by catecholamine release; skin pallor due to vasoconstriction triggered by catecholamine release; hypotension followed by hypovolaemia and perhaps arising after myocardial insufficiency; and confusion, aggression, drowsiness and coma caused by cerebral hypoxia or acidosis. Tachypnoea owing to hypoxia and acidosis, general weakness caused by hypoxia and acidosis, thirst induced by hypovolaemia, and oliguria caused by reduced perfusion may also arise.

Abnormal growing central venous pressure indicates either hypotension or hypovolemia. Tachycardia accompanied by declined urine outflow implies either tension pneumothorax, cardiac tamponade or cardiac failure which is thought secondary to cardiac contusion or ischaemic heart disease. Echocardiography in such case may be helpful to distinguish cardiac failure from other diseases. Cardiac failure manifests a weak contractibility myocardium; treatment with an inotropic drug such as dobutamine may be appropriate.

== Cause ==
The annual incidence of shock of any etiology is 0.3 to 0.7 per 1000, with hemorrhagic shock being most common in the intensive care unit. Hypovolemic shock is the most common type of shock in children, most commonly due to diarrheal illness in the developing world.

Hypovolemic shock occurs as a result of either blood loss or extracellular fluid loss.

=== Blood loss ===
Hemorrhagic shock is hypovolemic shock from blood loss. Traumatic injury is by far the most common cause of hemorrhagic shock, particularly blunt and penetrating trauma, followed by upper and lower gastrointestinal sources, such as gastrointestinal (GI) bleed. Other causes of hemorrhagic shock include bleed from an ectopic pregnancy, bleeding from surgical intervention, vaginal bleeding, and splenic rupture.

Obstetrical, vascular, iatrogenic, and even urological sources have all been described. Bleeding may be either external or internal. A substantial amount of blood loss to the point of hemodynamic compromise may occur in the chest, abdomen, or the retroperitoneum. The thigh itself can hold up to 1 L to 2 L of blood.

Localizing and controlling the source of bleeding is of utmost importance to the treatment of hemorrhagic shock.

The sequence of the most-commonly-seen causes that lead to hemorrhagic type of hypovolemic shock is given in order of frequencies: blunt or penetrating trauma including multiple fractures absent from vessel impairment, upper gastrointestinal bleeding e.g., variceal hemorrhage, peptic ulcer., or lower GI bleeding e.g., diverticular, and arteriovenous malformation.

Except for the two most common causes, the less common causes are intra-operative and post-operative bleeding, abdominal aortic rupture or left ventricle aneurysm rupture, aortic–enteric fistula, hemorrhagic pancreatitis, iatrogenic e.g., inadvertent biopsy of arteriovenous malformation, severed artery., tumors or abscess erosion into major vessels, post-partum hemorrhage, uterine or vaginal hemorrhage owing to infection, tumors, lacerations, spontaneous peritoneal hemorrhage caused by bleeding diathesis, and ruptured hematoma.

=== Fluid loss ===
In spite of hemorrhage, the amount of circulating blood in the body may drop as well when one loses excessive body fluid owing to non-hemorrhagic reasons. Hypovolemic shock as a result of extracellular fluid loss can be of the 4 etiologies.

==== Gastrointestinal ====
Gastrointestinal (GI) losses can occur via many different etiologies. The gastrointestinal tract usually secretes between 3 and 6 liters of fluid per day. However, most of this fluid is reabsorbed as only 100 to 200 mL are lost in the stool. Volume depletion occurs when the fluid ordinarily secreted by the GI tract cannot be reabsorbed. This occurs when there is retractable vomiting, diarrhea, or external drainage via stoma or fistulas.

==== Kidneys ====
Renal losses of salt and fluid can lead to hypovolemic shock. The kidneys usually excrete sodium and water in a manner that matches sodium intake and water intake.

Diuretic therapy and osmotic diuresis from hyperglycemia can lead to excessive renal sodium and volume loss. In addition, there are several tubular and interstitial diseases beyond the scope of this article that cause severe salt-wasting nephropathy.

==== Skin ====
Fluid loss also can occur from the skin. In a hot and dry climate, skin fluid losses can be as high as 1 to 2 liters/hour. Patients with a skin barrier interrupted by burns or other skin lesions also can experience large fluid losses that lead to hypovolemic shock.

==== Third-spacing ====
Sequestration of fluid into a third space also can lead to volume loss and hypovolemic shock. Third-spacing of fluid can occur in intestinal obstruction, pancreatitis, obstruction of a major venous system, vascular endothelium or any other pathological condition that results in a massive inflammatory response.

== Pathophysiology ==
=== Blood loss ===
Hemorrhagic shock is due to the depletion of intravascular volume through blood loss to the point of being unable to match the tissues' demand for oxygen. As a result, mitochondria are no longer able to sustain aerobic metabolism for the production of oxygen and switch to the less efficient anaerobic metabolism to meet the cellular demand for adenosine triphosphate. In the latter process, pyruvate is produced and converted to lactic acid to regenerate nicotinamide adenine dinucleotide (NAD+) to maintain some degree of cellular respiration in the absence of oxygen.

The body compensates for volume loss by increasing heart rate and contractility, followed by baroreceptor activation resulting in sympathetic nervous system activation and peripheral vasoconstriction. Typically, there is a slight increase in the diastolic blood pressure with narrowing of the pulse pressure. As diastolic ventricular filling continues to decline and cardiac output decreases, systolic blood pressure drops.

Due to sympathetic nervous system activation, blood is diverted away from noncritical organs and tissues to preserve blood supply to vital organs such as the heart and brain. While prolonging heart and brain function, this also leads to other tissues being further deprived of oxygen causing more lactic acid production and worsening acidosis. This worsening acidosis along with hypoxemia, if left uncorrected, eventually causes the loss of peripheral vasoconstriction, worsening hemodynamic compromise, and death.

The body's compensation varies by cardiopulmonary comorbidities, age, and vasoactive medications. Due to these factors, heart rate and blood pressure responses are extremely variable and, therefore, cannot be relied upon as the sole means of diagnosis.

A key factor in the pathophysiology of hemorrhagic shock is the development of trauma-induced coagulopathy. Coagulopathy develops as a combination of several processes. The simultaneous loss of coagulation factors via hemorrhage, hemodilution with resuscitation fluids, and coagulation cascade dysfunction secondary to acidosis and hypothermia have been traditionally thought to be the cause of coagulopathy in trauma. However, this traditional model of trauma-induced coagulopathy may be too limited. Further studies have shown that a degree of coagulopathy begins in 25% to 56% of patients before initiation of the resuscitation. This has led to the recognition of trauma-induced coagulopathy as the sum of two distinct processes: acute coagulopathy of trauma and resuscitation-induced coagulopathy.

Trauma-induced coagulopathy is acutely worsened by the presence of acidosis and hypothermia. The activity of coagulation factors, fibrinogen depletion, and platelet quantity are all adversely affected by acidosis. Hypothermia (less than 34 C) compounds coagulopathy by impairing coagulation and is an independent risk factor for death in hemorrhagic shock.

=== Fluid loss ===
Hypovolemic shock results from depletion of intravascular volume, whether by extracellular fluid loss or blood loss. The body compensates with increased sympathetic tone resulting in increased heart rate, increased cardiac contractility, and peripheral vasoconstriction. The first changes in vital signs seen in hypovolemic shock include an increase in diastolic blood pressure with narrowed pulse pressure.

As volume status continues to decrease, systolic blood pressure drops. As a result, oxygen delivery to vital organs is unable to meet the oxygen needs of the cells. Cells switch from aerobic metabolism to anaerobic metabolism, resulting in lactic acidosis. As sympathetic drive increases, blood flow is diverted from other organs to preserve blood flow to the heart and brain. This propagates tissue ischemia and worsens lactic acidosis. If not corrected, there will be worsening hemodynamic compromise and, eventually, death.

== Diagnosis ==
Shock index (SI) has been defined as (heart rate)/(systolic blood pressure); SI≥0.6 is a clinical shock.

Such ratio value is clinically employed to determine the scope or emergence of shock. The SI correlates with the extent of hypovolemia and thus may facilitate the early identification of severely injured patients threatened by complications due to blood loss and therefore need urgent treatment, i.e. blood transfusion.

Patients classified by Shock Index: traditional vital signs presented at the emergency department (ED) admission and at first scene.
	Group I (SI <0.6, no shock)	Group II (SI ≥0.6 to <1.0, mild shock)	Group III (SI ≥1.0 to <1.4, moderate shock)	Group IV (SI ≥1.4, severe shock)
SBP at scene (mmHg)				
Mean ± standard deviation	136.8 (32.8)	121.9 (29.4)	105.2 (33.1)	92.9 (34.4)
Median (IQR)	138 (120 to 160)	120 (105 to 140)	100 (90 to 120)	90 (70 to 110)
SBP at ED (mmHg)				
Mean ± standard deviation	148.4 (25.6)	124.1 (20.2)	96.9 (16.8)	70.6 (15.7)
Median (IQR)	147 (130 to 160)	120 (110 to 138)	98 (86 to 108)	70 (60 to 80)
HR at scene (beats/minute)				
Mean ± standard deviation	83.0 (19.2)	94.0 (20.6)	103.7 (26.6)	110.5 (31.3)
Median (IQR)	80 (70 to 95)	94 (80 to 105)	105 (90 to 120)	115 (100 to 130)
HR at ED (beats/minute)				
Mean ± standard deviation	73.7 (13.6)	91.3 (15.1)	109.1 (17.9)	122.7 (19.5)
Median (IQR)	74 (65 to 80)	90 (80 to 100)	110 (100 to 120)	120 (110 to 135)
SI at scene (beats/minute)				
Mean ± standard deviation	0.6 (0.2)	0.8 (0.3)	1.1 (0.4)	1.3 (0.5)
Median (IQR)	0.6 (0.5 to 0.7)	0.8 (0.6 to 0.9)	1.0 (1.0 to 1.0)	1.2 (0.9 to 1.6)

Data presented as n (%), mean ± standard deviation or median (interquartile range (IQR)). n = 21,853; P <0.001 for all parameters. ED Emergency department, GCS Glasgow coma scale, HR Heart rate, SBP Systolic blood pressure, SI = Shock index.

=== Bleeding ===
Recognizing the degree of blood loss via vital sign and mental status abnormalities is important. The American College of Surgeons Advanced Trauma Life Support (ATLS) hemorrhagic shock classification links the amount of blood loss to expected physiologic responses in a healthy 70 kg patient. As total circulating blood volume accounts for approximately 7% of total body weight, this equals approximately five liters in the average 70 kg male patient.

- Class 1: Volume loss up to 15% of total blood volume, approximately 750 mL. Heart rate is minimally elevated or normal. Typically, there is no change in blood pressure, pulse pressure, or respiratory rate.
- Class 2: Volume loss from 15% to 30% of total blood volume, from 750 mL to 1500 mL. Heart rate and respiratory rate become elevated (100 BPM to 120 BPM, 20 RR to 24 RR). Pulse pressure begins to narrow, but systolic blood pressure may be unchanged to slightly decreased.
- Class 3: Volume loss from 30% to 40% of total blood volume, from 1500 mL to 2000 mL. A significant drop in blood pressure and changes in mental status occur. Heart rate and respiratory rate are significantly elevated (more than 120 BPM). Urine output declines. Capillary refill is delayed.
- Class 4: Volume loss over 40% of total blood volume. Hypotension with narrow pulse pressure (less than 25 mmHg). Tachycardia becomes more pronounced (more than 120 BPM), and mental status becomes increasingly altered. Urine output is minimal or absent. Capillary refill is delayed.

Again, the above is outlined for a healthy 70 kg individual. Clinical factors must be taken into account when assessing patients. For example, elderly patients taking beta blockers can alter the patient's physiologic response to decreased blood volume by inhibiting mechanism to increase heart rate. As another, patients with baseline hypertension may be functionally hypotensive with a systolic blood pressure of 110 mmHg.

=== Non-bleeding ===
Various laboratory values can be abnormal in hypovolemic shock. Patients can have increased BUN and serum creatinine as a result of pre-renal kidney failure. Hypernatremia or hyponatremia can result, as can hyperkalemia or hypokalemia.

Lactic acidosis can result from increased anaerobic metabolism. However, the effect of acid–base balance can be variable as patients with large GI losses can become alkalotic.

In cases of hemorrhagic shock, hematocrit and hemoglobin can be severely decreased. However, with a reduction in plasma volume, hematocrit and hemoglobin can be increased due to hemoconcentration.

Low urinary sodium is commonly found in hypovolemic patients as the kidneys attempt to conserve sodium and water to expand the extracellular volume. However, sodium urine can be low in a euvolemic patient with heart failure, cirrhosis, or nephrotic syndrome. Fractional excretion of sodium under 1% is also suggestive of volume depletion. Elevated urine osmolality can also suggest hypovolemia. However, this number also can be elevated in the setting of impaired concentrating ability by the kidneys.

Central venous pressure (CVP) is often used to assess volume status. However, its usefulness in determining volume responsiveness has recently come into question. Ventilator settings, chest wall compliance, and right-sided heart failure can compromise CVPs accuracy as a measure of volume status. Measurements of pulse pressure variation via various commercial devices has also been postulated as a measure of volume responsiveness. However, pulse pressure variation as a measure of fluid responsiveness is only valid in patients without spontaneous breaths or arrhythmias. The accuracy of pulse pressure variation also can be compromised in right heart failure, decreased lung or chest wall compliance, and high respiratory rates.

Similar to examining pulse pressure variation, measuring respiratory variation in inferior vena cava diameter as a measure of volume responsiveness has only been validated in patients without spontaneous breaths or arrhythmias.

Measuring the effect of passive leg raises on cardiac contractility by echo appears to be the most accurate measurement of volume responsiveness, although it is also subject to limitations.

History and physical can often make the diagnosis of hypovolemic shock. For patients with hemorrhagic shock, a history of trauma or recent surgery is present. For hypovolemic shock due to fluid losses, history and physical should attempt to identify possible GI, renal, skin, or third-spacing as a cause of extracellular fluid loss.

Although relatively nonsensitive and nonspecific, physical exam can be helpful in determining the presence of hypovolemic shock. Physical findings suggestive of volume depletion include dry mucous membranes, decreased skin turgor, and low jugular venous distention. Tachycardia and hypotension can be seen along with decreased urinary output.

=== Differential diagnosis ===
While hemorrhage is the most common cause of shock in the trauma patient, other causes of shock are to remain on the differential. Obstructive shock can occur in the setting of tension pneumothorax and cardiac tamponade. These etiologies should be uncovered in the primary survey. In the setting of head or neck trauma, an inadequate sympathetic response, or neurogenic shock, is a type of distributive shock that is caused by a decrease in peripheral vascular resistance. This is suggested by an inappropriately low heart rate in the setting of hypotension. Cardiac contusion and infarctions can result in cardiogenic shock. Finally, other causes should be considered that are not related to trauma or blood loss. In the undifferentiated patient with shock, septic shock and toxic causes are also on the differential.

== Management ==
The first step in managing hemorrhagic shock is recognition. Ideally, This should occur before the development of hypotension. Close attention should be paid to physiological responses to low-blood volume. Tachycardia, tachypnea, and narrowing pulse pressure may be the initial signs. Cool extremities and delayed capillary refill are signs of peripheral vasoconstriction.

=== Bleeding ===
In the setting of trauma, an algorithmic approach via the primary and secondary surveys is suggested by ATLS. Physical exam and radiological evaluations can help localize sources of bleeding. A trauma ultrasound, or Focused Assessment with Sonography for Trauma (FAST), has been incorporated in many circumstances into the initial surveys. The specificity of a FAST scan has been reported above 99%, but a negative ultrasound does not rule out intra-abdominal pathology.

With a broader understanding of the pathophysiology of hemorrhagic shock, treatment in trauma has expanded from a simple massive transfusion method to a more comprehensive management strategy of "damage control resuscitation". The concept of damage control resuscitation focuses on permissive hypotension, hemostatic resuscitation, and hemorrhage control to adequately treat the "lethal triad" of coagulopathy, acidosis, and hypothermia that occurs in trauma.

Hypotensive resuscitation has been suggested for the hemorrhagic shock patient without head trauma. The aim is to achieve a systolic blood pressure of 90 mmHg in order to maintain tissue perfusion without inducing re-bleeding from recently clotted vessels. Permissive hypotension is a means of restricting fluid administration until hemorrhage is controlled while accepting a short period of suboptimal end-organ perfusion. Studies regarding permissive hypotension have yielded conflicting results and must take into account type of injury (penetrating versus blunt), the likelihood of intracranial injury, the severity of the injury, as well as proximity to a trauma center and definitive hemorrhage control.

The quantity, type of fluids to be used, and endpoints of resuscitation remain topics of much study and debate. For crystalloid resuscitation, normal saline and lactated ringers are the most commonly used fluids. Normal saline has the drawback of causing a non-anion gap hyperchloremic metabolic acidosis due to the high chloride content, while lactated ringers can cause a metabolic alkalosis as lactate metabolism regenerates into bicarbonate.

Recent trends in damage control resuscitation focus on "hemostatic resuscitation" which pushes for early use of blood products rather than an abundance of crystalloids in order to minimize the metabolic derangement, resuscitation-induced coagulopathy, and the hemodilution that occurs with crystalloid resuscitation. The end goal of resuscitation and the ratios of blood products remain at the center of much study and debate. A recent study has shown no significant difference in mortality at 24 hours or 30 days between ratios of 1:1:1 and 1:1:2 of plasma to platelets to packed RBCs. However, patients that received the more balanced ratio of 1:1:1 were less likely to die as a result of exsanguination in 24 hours and were more likely to achieve hemostasis. Additionally, reduction in time to first plasma transfusion has shown a significant reduction in mortality in damage control resuscitation.

In addition to blood products, products that prevent the breakdown of fibrin in clots, or antifibrinolytics, have been studied for their utility in the treatment of hemorrhagic shock in the trauma patient. Several antifibrinolytics have been shown to be safe and effective in elective surgery. The CRASH-2 study was a randomized control trial of tranexamic acid versus placebo in trauma has been shown to decrease overall mortality when given in the first three hours of injury. Follow-up analysis shows additional benefit to tranexamic acid when given in the first three hours after surgery.

Damage control resuscitation is to occur in conjunction with prompt intervention to control the source of bleeding. Strategies may differ depending on proximity to definitive treatment.

For patients in hemorrhagic shock, early use of blood products over crystalloid resuscitation results in better outcomes. Balanced transfusion using 1:1:1 or 1:1:2 of plasma to platelets to packed red blood cells results in better hemostasis. Anti-fibrinolytic administration to patients with severe bleed within 3 hours of traumatic injury appears to decrease death from major bleed as shown in the CRASH-2 trial. Research on oxygen-carrying substitutes as an alternative to packed red blood cells is ongoing, although no blood substitutes have been approved for use in the United States.

=== Fluid loss ===
For patients in hypovolemic shock due to fluid losses, the exact fluid deficit cannot be determined. Therefore, it is prudent to start with 2 liters of isotonic crystalloid solution infused rapidly as an attempt to quickly restore tissue perfusion. Fluid repletion can be monitored by measuring blood pressure, urine output, mental status, and peripheral edema. Multiple modalities exist for measuring fluid responsiveness such as ultrasound, central venous pressure monitoring, and pulse pressure fluctuation as described above. Vasopressors may be used if blood pressure does not improve with fluids.

Crystalloid fluid resuscitation is preferred over colloid solutions for severe volume depletion not due to bleeding. The type of crystalloid used to resuscitate the patient can be individualized based on the patients' chemistries, estimated volume of resuscitation, acid/base status, and physician or institutional preferences.

Isotonic saline is hyperchloremic relative to blood plasma, and resuscitation with large amounts can lead to hyperchloremic metabolic acidosis. Several other isotonic fluids with lower chloride concentrations exist, such as lactated Ringer's solution or PlasmaLyte. These solutions are often referred to as buffered or balanced crystalloids. Some evidence suggests that patients who need large volume resuscitation may have a less renal injury with restrictive chloride strategies and use of balanced crystalloids. Crystalloid solutions are equally as effective and much less expensive than colloid. Commonly used colloid solutions include those containing albumin or hyperoncotic starch. Studies examining albumin solutions for resuscitation have not shown improved outcomes, while other studies have shown resuscitation with hyper-oncotic starch leads to increased mortality rate and renal failure. Patients in shock can appear cold, clammy, and cyanotic.

Hypothermia increases the mortality rate of patients with hypovolemic shock. It is advised to keep the patient warm for the sake of maintaining the temperatures of all kinds of fluids inside the patient.

=== Monitoring parameters ===
- Oxygen saturation by pulse oximetry (SpO2).
- Respiratory rate.
- Pulse rate.
- Arterial blood pressure.
- Pulse pressure.
- Central venous pressure.
- Urine output.
- Base deficit and/or lactic acid.
- Temperature.
- Mental state.
- Changes in the electrocardiogram.

== Prognosis ==
If the vital organs are deprived of perfusion for more than just a short time, the prognosis is generally not good. Shock is still a medical emergency characterized by a high mortality rate. Early identification of patients who are likely to succumb to their illness is of utmost importance.

== Epidemiology ==
=== Blood loss ===
Trauma remains a leading cause of death worldwide with approximately half of these attributed to hemorrhage. In the United States in 2001, trauma was the third leading cause of death overall, and the leading cause of death in those aged 1 to 44 years. While trauma spans all demographics, it disproportionately affects the young with 40% of injuries occurring in ages 20 to 39 years by one country's account. Of this 40%, the greatest incidence was in the 20 to 24-year-old range.

The preponderance of hemorrhagic shock cases resulting from trauma is high. During one year, one trauma center reported 62.2% of massive transfusions occur in the setting of trauma. The remaining cases are divided among cardiovascular surgery, critical care, cardiology, obstetrics, and general surgery, with trauma utilizing over 75% of the blood products.

As patients age, physiological reserves decrease the likelihood of anticoagulant use increases and the number of comorbidities increases. Due to this, elderly patients are less likely to handle the physiological stresses of hemorrhagic shock and may decompensate more quickly.

=== Fluid loss ===
While the incidence of hypovolemic shock from extracellular fluid loss is difficult to quantify, it is known that hemorrhagic shock is most commonly due to trauma. In one study, 62.2% of massive transfusions at a level 1 trauma center were due to traumatic injury. In this study, 75% of the blood products used were related to traumatic injury. Elderly patients are more likely to experience hypovolemic shock due to fluid losses as they have less physiologic reserve.

Hypovolemia secondary to diarrhea and/or dehydration is thought to be predominant in low-income countries.

== See also ==
- Adipsia
- Anemia
- Cardiac index
- Heart murmur
