= Flor Cazarín González =

Mexican suspected serial killer

- Born: 1976 (age 49–50); Chihuahua, Mexico
- Other name: "The Godmother"
- Conviction: Murder x2
- Penalty: 44 years imprisonment

Details
- Victims: 2–25
- Span of crimes: 2016–2018
- Country: Mexico
- State: Chihuahua
- Date apprehended: June 27, 2018

Flor Cazarín González (born 1976), known as The Godmother (Spanish: La Madrina), is a Mexican suspected serial killer who, together with her son Roberto and other men, murdered and robbed adults and elderly people in Chihuahua City between 2016 and 2018. In February 2020, she was convicted of killing two women, but her total victim count is estimated to be between 20 and 25.

== Crimes ==
=== Modus operandi ===
Using various pseudonyms, Flor would approach the victims and earn their trust. Sometimes, she would enter a relationship with them for the purpose of fraud, for example, buying various goods on credit. When she decided she no longer needed the victims, Cazarín would drug them with clonazepam and ransack their homes, before either stabbing or strangling them to death.

=== Murder of Carlota Múñoz Durán ===
On July 11, 2016, Cazarín, Roberto and another man murdered a 49-year-old woman, Carlota Múñoz Durán. According to investigators, Carlota Múñoz died in her own house from hypovolemic shock, caused by 91 stab wounds to the torso. She was unconscious as a result of drugging, and her killers had stolen her car and various appliances. Carlota's body was found three days after the crime occurred.

=== Murder of Griselda Mojarro Delgado ===
In November 2016, the gang drugged and kidnapped Griselda Mojarro, driving her in her own car to an isolated area. There, she was hit on the head with a hammer and stabbed 18 times in the torso and neck. Like the previous victim, the cause of death was ruled to be from hypovolemic shock.

== See also ==
- List of serial killers by country
