= Bullous small vessel vasculitis =

- Specialty: Dermatology

Bullous small vessel vasculitis, also known as bullous variant of small vessel vasculitis, is a cutaneous condition in which patients with small vessel vasculitis will develop superimposed vesicles and bullae, especially on the distal extremities.

== See also ==
- Bullous lymphedema
- List of cutaneous conditions
