= Hypovolemia =

Low blood volume

- Other names: Oligemia, hypovolaemia, oligaemia, hypovolæmia, volume depletion
- A diagram showing the formation of interstitial fluid from the bloodstream
- Specialty: Emergency medicine
- Symptoms: Headache, fatigue, nausea, profuse sweating, dizziness
- Complications: Cardiac arrest, hypovolemic shock
- Differential diagnosis: Dehydration

Hypovolemia, also known as volume depletion or volume contraction, is a state of abnormally low extracellular fluid in the body. This may be due to either a loss of both salt and water or a decrease in blood volume. Hypovolemia refers to the loss of extracellular fluid and should not be confused with dehydration.

Hypovolemia is caused by a variety of events, but these can be simplified into two categories: those that are associated with kidney function and those that are not.

The signs and symptoms of hypovolemia worsen as the amount of fluid lost increases. Immediately or shortly after mild fluid loss (from blood donation, diarrhea, vomiting, bleeding from trauma, etc.), one may experience headache, fatigue, weakness, dizziness, or thirst. Untreated hypovolemia or excessive and rapid losses of volume may lead to hypovolemic shock, with signs and symptoms including increased heart rate, low blood pressure, pale or cold skin, and altered mental status. A person exhibiting these signs is experiencing a medical emergency and needs the lost fluid volume replaced.

== Signs and symptoms ==
Signs and symptoms of hypovolemia progress with increased loss of fluid volume.

Early symptoms of hypovolemia include headache, fatigue, weakness, thirst, and dizziness. The more severe signs and symptoms are often associated with hypovolemic shock. These include oliguria, cyanosis, abdominal and chest pain, hypotension, tachycardia, cold hands and feet, and progressively altering mental status.

== Causes ==
The causes of hypovolemia can be characterized into two categories:

=== Kidney ===
- Loss of body sodium and consequent intravascular water (due to impaired reabsorption of salt and water in the tubules of the kidneys)
  - Osmotic diuresis: the increase in urine production due to an excess of osmotic (namely glucose and urea) load in the tubules of the kidneys
  - Overuse of pharmacologic diuretics
  - Impaired response to hormones controlling salt and water balance (see mineralocorticoids)
  - Impaired kidney function due to tubular injury or other diseases

=== Other ===
- Loss of bodily fluids due to:
  - Gastrointestinal losses; e.g. vomiting and diarrhea
  - Skin losses; e.g. excessive sweating and burns
  - Respiratory losses; e.g. hyperventilation (breathing fast)
- Build up of fluid in empty spaces (third spaces) of the body due to:
  - Acute pancreatitis
  - Intestinal obstruction
  - Increase in vascular permeability
  - Dysautonomia such as vasovagal syncope or postural orthostatic tachycardia syndrome (POTS)
  - Hypoalbuminemia
- Loss of blood (external or internal bleeding or blood donation)

== Pathophysiology ==
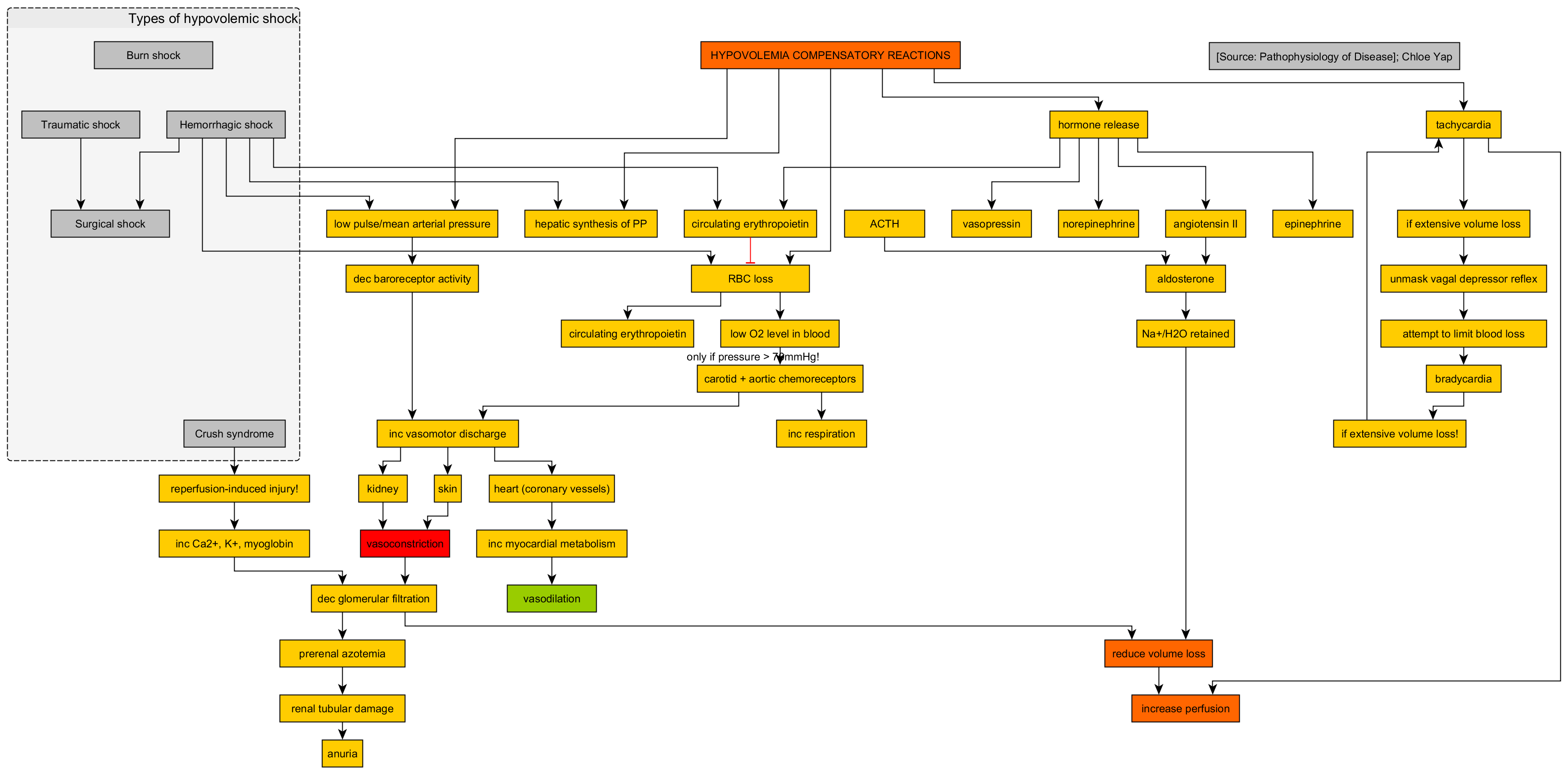
Pathophysiology of hypovolemia

The signs and symptoms of hypovolemia are primarily due to the consequences of decreased circulating volume and a subsequent reduction in the amount of blood reaching the tissues of the body. In order to properly perform their functions, tissues require the oxygen transported in the blood. A decrease in circulating volume can lead to a decrease in bloodflow to the brain, resulting in headache and dizziness.

Baroreceptors in the body (primarily those located in the carotid sinuses and aortic arch) sense the reduction of circulating fluid and send signals to the brain to increase sympathetic response (see also: baroreflex). This sympathetic response is to release epinephrine and norepinephrine, which results in peripheral vasoconstriction (reducing size of blood vessels) in order to conserve the circulating fluids for organs vital to survival (i.e. brain and heart). Peripheral vasoconstriction accounts for the cold extremities (hands and feet), increased heart rate, increased cardiac output (and associated chest pain). Eventually, there will be less perfusion to the kidneys, resulting in decreased urine output.

== Diagnosis ==
Hypovolemia can be recognized by a fast heart rate, low blood pressure, and the absence of perfusion as assessed by skin signs (skin turning pale) and/or capillary refill on forehead, lips and nail beds. The patient may feel dizzy, faint, nauseated, or very thirsty. These signs are also characteristic of most types of shock.

In children, compensation can result in an artificially high blood pressure despite hypovolemia (a decrease in blood volume). Children typically are able to compensate (maintain blood pressure despite hypovolemia) for a longer period than adults, but deteriorate rapidly and severely once they are unable to compensate (decompensate). Consequently, any possibility of internal bleeding in children should be treated aggressively.

Signs of external bleeding should be assessed, noting that individuals can bleed internally without external blood loss or otherwise apparent signs.

There should be considered possible mechanisms of injury that may have caused internal bleeding, such as ruptured or bruised internal organs. If trained to do so and if the situation permits, there should be conducted a secondary survey and checked the chest and abdomen for pain, deformity, guarding, discoloration or swelling. Bleeding into the abdominal cavity can cause the classical bruising patterns of Grey Turner's sign (bruising along the sides) or Cullen's sign (around the navel).

=== Examination ===
In a hospital, physicians respond to a case of hypovolemic shock by conducting these examinations:

- Blood tests: U+Es/Chem7, full blood count, glucose, blood type and screen
- Central venous catheter
- Arterial line
- Urine output measurements (via urinary catheter)
- Blood pressure
- SpO2 oxygen saturation monitoring

=== Stages ===
Untreated hypovolemia can lead to shock (see also: hypovolemic shock). Most sources state that there are 4 stages of hypovolemia and subsequent shock; however, a number of other systems exist with as many as 6 stages.

The 4 stages are sometimes known as the "Tennis" staging of hypovolemic shock, as the stages of blood loss (under 15% of volume, 15–30% of volume, 30–40% of volume and above 40% of volume) mimic the scores in a game of tennis: 15, 15–30, 30–40 and 40. It is basically the same as used in classifying bleeding by blood loss. The four classes of hemorrhagic shock are based on the estimated percentage of blood volume lost and the associated changes in heart rate, blood pressure, respiratory rate, urine output, and mental status.

The signs and symptoms of the major stages of hypovolemic shock include:

	Stage 1	Stage 2	Stage 3	Stage 4
Blood loss	Up to 15% (750 mL)	15–30% (750–1500 mL)	30–40% (1500–2000 mL)	Over 40% (over 2000 mL)
Blood pressure	Normal (Maintained by vasoconstriction)	Increased diastolic BP	Systolic BP < 100	Systolic BP < 70
Heart rate	Normal	Slight tachycardia (> 100 bpm)	Tachycardia (> 120 bpm)	Extreme tachycardia (> 140 bpm) with weak pulse
Respiratory rate	Normal	Increased (> 20)	Tachypneic (> 30)	Extreme tachypnea
Mental status	Normal	Slight anxiety, restless	Altered, confused	Decreased LOC, lethargy, coma
Skin	Pale	Pale, cool, clammy	Increased diaphoresis	Extreme diaphoresis; mottling possible
Capillary refill	Normal	Delayed	Delayed	Absent
Urine output	Normal	20–30 mL/h	20 mL/h	Negligible

== Treatment ==
=== Field care ===
The most important step in treatment of hypovolemic shock is to identify and control the source of bleeding.

Medical personnel should immediately supply emergency oxygen to increase efficiency of the patient's remaining blood supply. This intervention can be life-saving.

Also, the respiratory pump is especially important during hypovolemia as spontaneous breathing may help reduce the effect of this loss of blood pressure on stroke volume by increasing venous return.

The use of intravenous fluids (IVs) may help compensate for lost fluid volume, but IV fluids cannot carry oxygen the way blood does—however, researchers are developing blood substitutes that can. Infusing colloid or crystalloid IV fluids also dilutes clotting factors in the blood, increasing the risk of bleeding. Current best practice allow permissive hypotension in patients with hypovolemic shock, both avoid overly diluting clotting factors and avoid artificially raising blood pressure to a point where it "blows off" clots that have formed.

=== Hospital treatment ===
Fluid replacement is beneficial in hypovolemia of stage 2, and is necessary in stage 3 and 4. See also the discussion of shock and the importance of treating reversible shock while it can still be countered.

The severity of hypovolemic shock due to hemorrhage is commonly classified into four classes according to the estimated percentage of blood volume lost and the associated physiological response.

- IV access
- Oxygen as required
- Fresh frozen plasma or blood transfusion
- Surgical repair at sites of bleeding

Vasopressors (such as dopamine and noradrenaline) should generally be avoided, as they may result in further tissue ischemia and don't correct the primary problem. Fluids are the preferred choice of therapy.

== History ==
In cases where loss of blood volume is clearly attributable to bleeding (as opposed to, e.g., dehydration), most medical practitioners prefer the term exsanguination for its greater specificity and descriptiveness, with the effect that the latter term is now more common in the relevant context.

== See also ==
- Hypervolemia
- Non-pneumatic anti-shock garment
- Polycythemia, an increase of the hematocrit level, with the "relative polycythemia" being a decrease in the volume of plasma
- Volume status
