= Volume expansion =

Volume expansion may refer to:

- Thermal expansion
- Hypervolemia, an abnormally high level of fluid in the blood
