= Volume contraction =

Decrease in the volume of body fluid

Volume contraction is a decrease in the volume of body fluid, including the dissolved substances that maintain osmotic balance (osmolytes). The loss of the water component of body fluid is specifically termed dehydration.

== By body fluid compartment ==
Volume contraction is more or less a loss of extracellular fluid (ECF) and/or intracellular fluid (ICF).

=== ECF volume contraction ===
Volume contraction of extracellular fluid is directly coupled to and almost proportional to volume contraction of blood plasma, which is termed hypovolemia. Thus, it primarily affects the circulatory system, potentially causing hypovolemic shock.

ECF volume contraction or hypovolemia is usually the type of volume contraction of primary concern in emergency, since ECF is approximately half the volume of ICF and is the first to be affected in e.g. bleeding. Volume contraction is sometimes even used synonymously with hypovolemia.

=== ICF volume contraction ===
Volume contraction of intracellular fluid may occur after substantial fluid loss, since it is much larger than ECF volume, or loss of potassium (K^{+}) see section below.

ICF volume contraction may cause disturbances in various organs throughout the body.

=== Dependence on lost solutes ===
Na^{+} loss approximately correlates with fluid loss from ECF, since Na^{+} has a much higher concentration in ECF than ICF. In contrast, K^{+} has a much higher concentration in ICF than ECF, and therefore its loss rather correlates with fluid loss from ICF, since K^{+} loss from ECF causes the K^{+} in ICF to diffuse out of the cells, dragging water with it by osmosis.

=== Estimation ===
When the body loses fluids, the amount lost from ICF and ECF, respectively, can be estimated by measuring volume and amount of substance of sodium (Na^{+}) and potassium (K^{+}) in the lost fluid, as well as estimating the body composition of the person.

1. To calculate an estimation, the total amount of substance in the body before the loss is first estimated:

$n_b = Osm_b \times TBW_b$

where:

- n_{b} = Total amount of substance before fluid loss
- Osm_{b} = Body osmolarity before loss (almost equal to plasma osmolality of 275-299 milli-osmoles per kilogram)
- TBW_{b} = Total body water before loss (approximately 60% of body weight, or using tritiated water or deuterium)

2. The total amount of substance in the body after the loss is then estimated:

$n_a = n_b - n_{lost Na^+} - n_{lost K^+}$

where:

- n_{a} = Total amount of substance after fluid loss
- n_{b} = Total amount of substance before fluid loss
- n_{lost Na+} = Amount of substance of lost sodium
- n_{lost K+} = Amount of substance of lost potassium

3. The new osmolarity becomes:

$Osm_a = \frac{n_a}{TBW_b - V_{lost}}$

where:

- Osm_{a} = Body osmolarity after loss
- n_{a} = Total amount of substance after fluid loss
- TBW_{b} = Total body water before loss
- V_{lost} = Volume of lost fluid

4. This osmolarity is evenly distributed in the body, and is used to estimate the new volumes of ICF and ECF, respectively:

$V_{ICF a} = \frac{n_{ICF a}}{Osm_a} = \frac{V_{ICF b} \times Osm_b - n_{lost K^+}}{Osm_a}$

where:

- V_{ICF a} = Intracellular fluid volume after fluid loss
- n_{ICF a} = Amount of substance in ICF after fluid loss
- Osm_{a} = Body osmolarity after loss
- V_{ICF b} = Intracellular fluid volume before fluid loss (approximately 40% of body weight, or subtracting ECF from TBW)
- Osm_{b} = Body osmolarity before loss (almost equal to plasma osmolality of 275-299 milli-osmoles per kilogram)
- n_{lost K+} = Amount of substance of lost potassium

In homologous manner:

$V_{ECF a} = \frac{n_{ECF a}}{Osm_a} = \frac{V_{ECF b} \times Osm_b - n_{lost Na^+}}{Osm_a}$

where:

- V_{ECF a} = Extracellular fluid volume after fluid loss
- n_{ECF a} = Amount of substance in ECF after fluid loss
- V_{ECF b} = Extracellular fluid volume before fluid loss (approximately 20% of body weight, or by using inulin)
- Osm_{b} = Body osmolarity before loss (almost equal to plasma osmolality of 275-299 milli-osmoles per kilogram)
- n_{lost K+} = Amount of substance of lost potassium

5. The volume of lost fluid from each compartment:

$V_{lost ICF} = V_{ICF b} - V_{ICF a}$

$V_{lost ECF} = V_{ECF b} - V_{ECF a}$

where:

- V_{I/ECF b} = Intra/Extra-cellular fluid volume before fluid loss
- V_{I/ECF a} = Intra/Extra-cellular fluid volume after fluid loss

== See also ==
- Contraction alkalosis, the increase in blood pH that occurs as a result of fluid losses
