= Bullous lymphedema =

- Specialty: Dermatology

Bullous lymphedema is a skin condition that usually occurs with poorly controlled edema related to heart failure and fluid overload, and compression results in healing.

== See also ==
- Lymphedema
- Skin lesion
