= Contraction alkalosis =

Increase in blood pH resulting from fluid loss

Contraction alkalosis refers to the increase in blood pH that occurs as a result of fluid losses (volume contraction). The change in pH is especially pronounced with acidic fluid losses caused by problems like vomiting.

== Pathophysiology ==
There are several possible explanations for the process of alkalosis observed after volume contraction.

One popular theory is that alkalosis is simply the loss of solvent volume without a proportional loss in bicarbonate concentration or increase in carbon dioxide concentration. This explanation may be especially appropriate for the very short term after volume loss.

Another suggests that the alkalosis is due to renal compensatory mechanisms used to correct volume loss. Extracellular fluid (ECF) volume contraction is associated with decreased blood volume and decreased renal perfusion pressure. Three compensation mechanisms engage as a result:

1. renin secretion is increased,
2. production of angiotensin II is increased, and
3. secretion of aldosterone is increased.

Increases in angiotensin II cause increased Na^{+}–H^{+} exchange in the proximal tubule and increased HCO_{3}^{−} (bicarbonate) reabsorption in the proximal tubule due to increased luminal H^{+}. Increased aldosterone secretion stimulates the H-ATPase of alpha-intercalated cells of the collecting duct, which causes 1) increased distal tubule H^{+} secretion, worsening the metabolic alkalosis, and 2) increased generation of "new" bicarbonate within these same cells, which will be reabsorbed.

Additionally, increased aldosterone secretion causes increased collecting duct K^{+} secretion, in turn causing the hypokalemia seen with contraction alkalosis.

Finally, it has been suggested that the term "contraction alkalosis" is actually a misnomer, and that the alkalosis observed during volume contraction is actually attributable entirely to chloride depletion, which leads to a failure of pendrin, a chloride/bicarbonate exchanger in the collecting duct.

== Diagnosis ==
Diagnosis of contraction alkalosis is made by correlating laboratory data with clinical history and examination. Metabolic alkalosis in the presence of decreased effective circulatory volume, loop diuretic use, or other causes of intravascular depletion such as profound diarrhea should raise suspicion for contraction alkalosis as a likely etiology in the absence of other causes.

== Treatment ==
Treatment consists of NaCl infusion to correct ECF volume contraction and administration of K^{+} to replace urinary losses.
