= Blood volume =

Volume of blood in an organism's circulatory system

Blood volume, also called volemia (also spelled volaemia), is the volume of blood (blood cells and plasma) in the circulatory system of any individual.

== Humans ==
A typical adult has a blood volume of about 5 litres (180 imp fl oz; 170 US fl oz), with females and males having roughly the same blood percentage by weight (7–8%) Blood volume is regulated by the kidneys.

Blood volume (BV) can be calculated given the hematocrit (HC; the fraction of blood that is red blood cells) and plasma volume (PV), with the hematocrit being regulated via the blood oxygen content regulator:

$$BV = \frac{PV}{1-HC}$$

Blood volume measurement may be used in people with congestive heart failure, chronic hypertension, kidney failure and critical care.

The use of relative blood volume changes during dialysis is of questionable utility.

Total Blood Volume can be measured manually via the Dual Isotope or Dual Tracer Technique, a classic technique, available since the 1950s. This technique requires double labeling of the blood; that is 2 injections and 2 standards (51Cr-RBC for tagging red blood cells and I-HAS for tagging plasma volume) as well as withdrawing and re-infusing patients with their own blood for blood volume analysis results. This method may take up to 6 hours for accurate results. The blood volume is 70 ml/kg body weight in adult males, 65 ml/kg in adult females and 70-75 ml/kg in children (1 year old and over).

Total Blood Volume has been measured manually by the use of carbon monoxide (CO) as a tracer for more than 100 years and was first proposed by French scientists Grehant and Quinquaud in 1882. Soon after a usable set-up for human use was developed by Oxford scientists John Haldane and Lorrain Smith and presented in the Journal of Physiology in 1900.

=== Semi-automated system ===
Blood volumes can also been measured in humans using the non-radioactive, carbon monoxide (CO) rebreathing technique. With this technique, a small volume of pure CO gas is inhaled and rebreathed for a few minutes. During rebreathing, CO binds to hemoglobin present in red blood cells. Based on the increase in blood CO after the rebreathing period, the volume of blood can be determined through the dilution principle.

== Other animals ==
Animal	Blood volume (ml/kg)
Cat	55 (47–66)
Cow	55 (52–57)
Dog	86 (79–90)
Ferret	75
Gerbil	67
Goat	70
Guinea pig	75 (67–92)
Hamster	78
Horse	76
Human (male)	75
Human (female)	65
Monkey (rhesus)	54
Mouse	79 (78–80)
Pig	65
Rabbit	56 (44–70)
Rat	64 (50–70)
Sheep	60
Marmoset	60-70

The table at right shows circulating blood volumes, given as volume per kilogram, for healthy adults and some animals. However, it can be 15% less in obese and old animals.

== See also ==
- Volume status
- Hypovolemia
- Hypervolemia
