= Hemorrhagic shock =

Inadequate blood flow (shock) due to blood loss

- Video explanation of shock
- Specialty: Emergency medicine
- Symptoms: Fast heart rate, narrowing pulse pressure, anxiety, cool arms and legs, decreased consciousness, low blood pressure
- Causes: Trauma, gastrointestinal bleeding, childbirth, ectopic pregnancy, underlying blood vessel problems
- Diagnostic method: Based on examination and medical imaging
- Differential diagnosis: Other types of circulatory shock
- Treatment: Direct pressure, tourniquet use, tranexamic acid, blood products, temperature management, surgery
- Prognosis: Variable

Hemorrhagic shock is a type of hypovolemic shock that occurs due to blood loss. The underlying mechanism that results in shock involves not enough blood flow to body tissues. In this case, inadequate blood flow is caused by insufficient blood volume remaining within the cardiovascular system. Complications may include hypothermia, blood clotting problems, and multiple organ dysfunction syndrome.

== Causes ==
The cause of blood loss may include trauma (often blunt or penetrating), gastrointestinal bleeding, childbirth, ectopic pregnancy, and underlying blood vessel problems. Bleeding can occur internally or externally. Significant blood loss can occur within the abdomen, chest, and retroperitoneum. Ultrasound, in the emergency department, may be useful in determining the location of the blood loss.

== Symptoms ==
As blood loss occurs, the body attempts to compensate for the lack of volume within the cardiovascular system by increasing heart rate and vasoconstriction. If the source of bleeding is not stopped, this can cause blood to be lost more quickly as blood is pumped faster.

Early symptoms may include a fast heart rate, narrowing pulse pressure, shallow and rapid breathing, and agitation. As blood loss progresses, cool arms and legs, decreased consciousness, cyanosis, increasingly labored breathing, and low blood pressure may occur. Falling blood pressure may be the last sign of shock before it becomes irreversible.

== Treatment ==
Rapid, coordinated treatment is essential for patients presenting with hemorrhagic shock. The initial management is based on ATLS (Advanced Trauma Life Support). The primary treatment is stopping the source of bleeding. This may include direct pressure, pressure dressings, or tourniquet use. Other measures may include tranexamic acid, blood products, oxygen administration, and temperature management. In those without a head injury, the blood pressure may be permitted to remain relatively low until surgery can be performed. A shock index (heart rate/systolic blood pressure) of greater than 1 can indicate who is likely to need blood transfusions. About half of deaths due to trauma are due to bleeding and bleeding remains the primary preventable cause of trauma related death. The risk of death or poor outcomes is high.
