= Intravascular volume status =

In medicine, intravascular volume status refers to the volume of blood in a patient's circulatory system.

== Clinical assessment ==
Volume contraction of intravascular fluid (blood plasma) is termed hypovolemia.
