= Hypervolemia =

- Other names: Fluid overload, hypervolaemia, hypervolæmia
- A diagram showing the formation of interstitial fluid from the bloodstream
- Specialty: Endocrinology

Hypervolemia, also known as fluid overload, is the medical condition where there is too much fluid in the blood. The opposite condition is hypovolemia, which is too little fluid volume in the blood. Fluid volume excess in the intravascular compartment occurs due to an increase in total body sodium content and a consequent increase in extracellular body water. The mechanism usually stems from compromised regulatory mechanisms for sodium handling as seen in congestive heart failure (CHF), kidney failure, and liver failure. It may also be caused by excessive intake of sodium from foods, intravenous (IV) solutions and blood transfusions, medications, or diagnostic contrast dyes. Treatment typically includes administration of diuretics and limit the intake of water, fluids, sodium, and salt.

== Signs and symptoms ==
The excess fluid, primarily salt and water, builds up in various locations in the body and leads to an increase in weight, swelling in the legs and arms (peripheral edema), and/or fluid in the abdomen (ascites). Eventually, the fluid enters the air spaces in the lungs (pulmonary edema) reduces the amount of oxygen that can enter the blood, leading to anemia and causes shortness of breath (dyspnea) or enters pleural space by transudation (pleural effusion which also causes dyspnea), which is the best indicator of estimating central venous pressure is increased. It can also cause swelling of the face. Fluid can also collect in the lungs when lying down at night, possibly making nighttime breathing and sleeping difficult (paroxysmal nocturnal dyspnea).

=== Complications ===
Congestive heart failure is the most common result of fluid overload. Also, it may be associated with hyponatremia (hypervolemic hyponatremia).

== Causes ==
Excessive sodium and/or fluid intake:

- IV therapy containing sodium
- As a transfusion reaction to a rapid blood transfusion.
- High intake of sodium

Sodium and water retention:

- Heart failure
- Liver cirrhosis
- Nephrotic syndrome
- Corticosteroid therapy
- Hyperaldosteronism
- Low protein intake

Fluid shift into the intravascular space:

- Fluid remobilization after burn treatment
- Administration of hypertonic fluids, e.g. mannitol or hypertonic saline solution
- Administration of plasma proteins, such as albumin

== Treatment ==
Treatment includes diuretics, particularly loop diuretics.

== See also ==
- Volume status
- Volume overload
- Fluid balance
- Edema
- Anasarca (swelling of skin)
- Pleural effusion (excess fluid in the pleural cavity)
- Diuretics
- Aquapheresis
- Low pressure receptor zones
