= Skin turgor =

Elasticity of skin

Skin turgor (associated alongside capillary refilling) refers to the natural ability of the skin to instantly snap back into place after being stretched or deformed. When a person becomes dehydrated, their skin loses baseline elasticity, causing a noticeable drop in turgor that serves as a primary clinical marker for fluid loss.

To assess this, a healthcare provider gently pinches the skin on areas like the forearm or the back of the hand and measures how many seconds it takes to flatten out completely. Poor turgor causes the pinches tissue to remain elevated in a state known as "tenting," or in cases of server fluid depletion, it can produce a shriveled appearance historically termed the "washerwoman's hand" symptom.

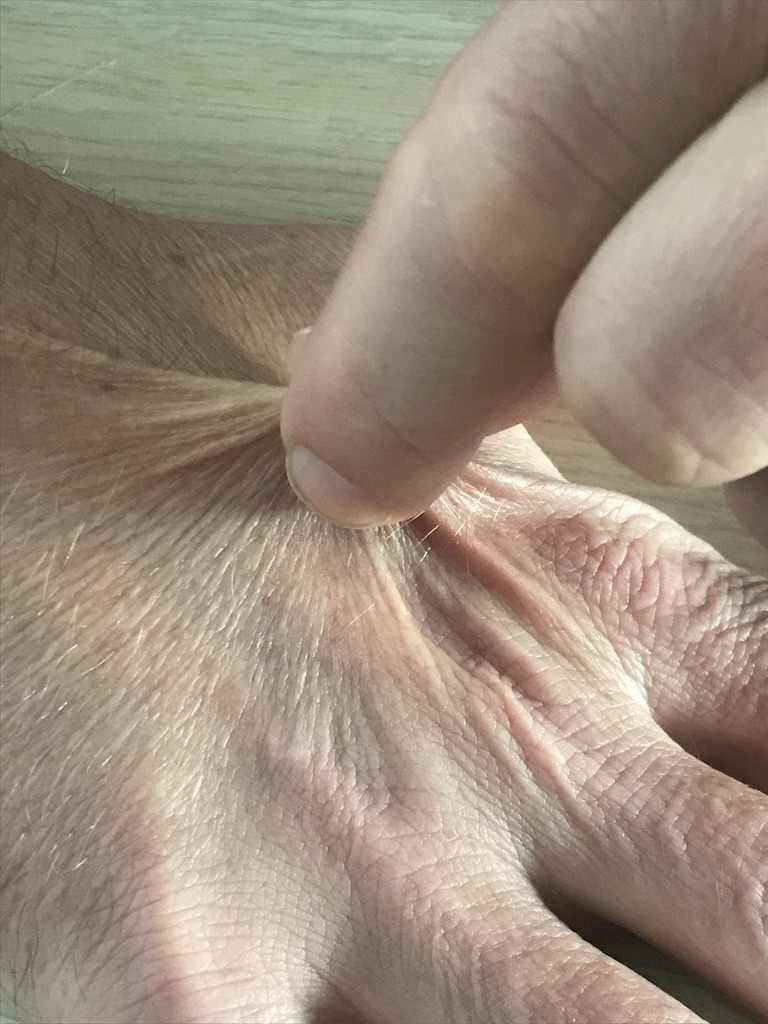
Skin turgor examination

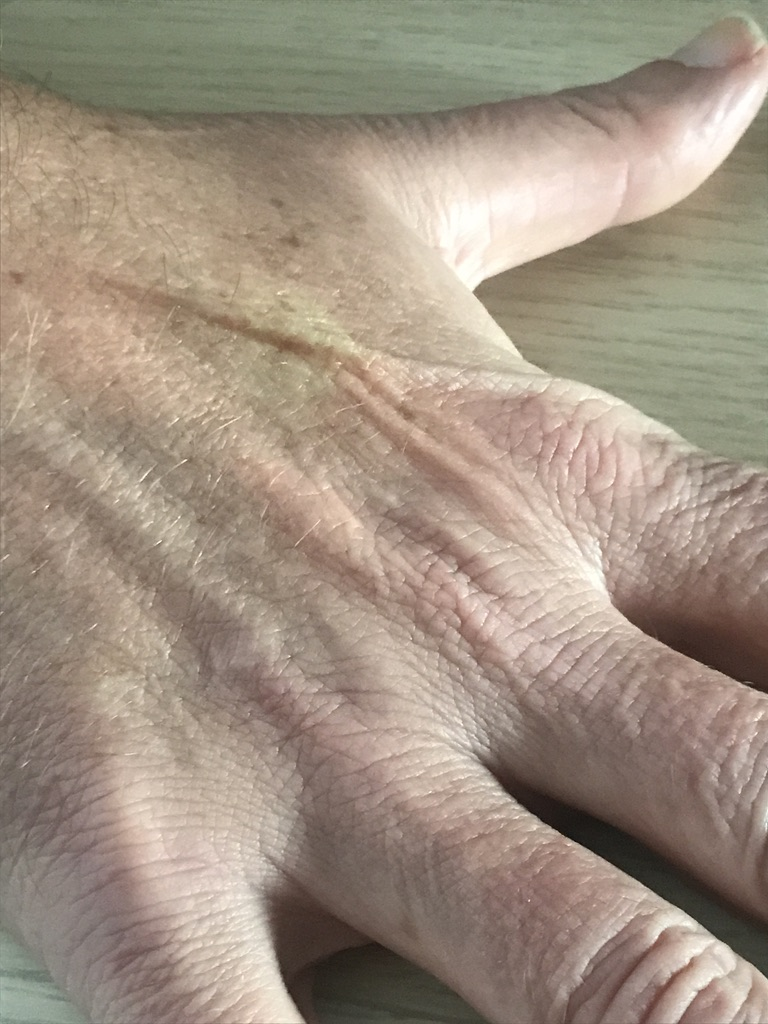
Dehydration - low skin turgor

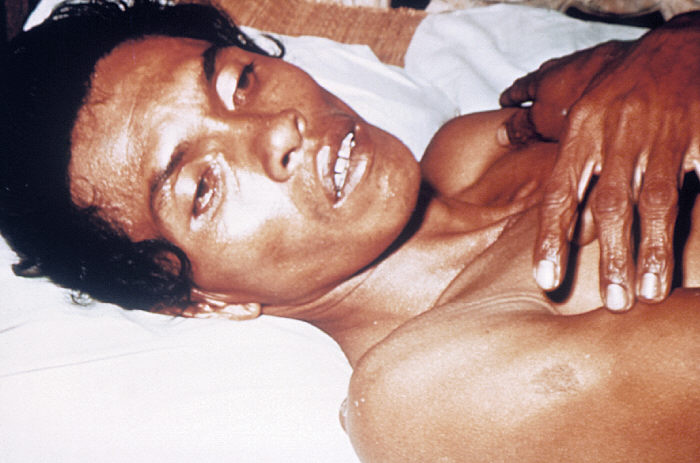
Severe dehydration resulted in a decreased skin turgor that produced the "Washer Woman's Hand" symptom

The test results are expressed as time it takes for the skin to return to the original shape. Special tools to deflect the skin have been introduced to improve the accuracy of the skin turgor test.

== Pathophysiology of Skin Tension ==
Skin turgor is directly regulated by the volume of interstitial fluid and the structural integrity of the extracellular matrix within the dermal layer. Under normal physiological conditions, hydrostatic pressure within the capillaries pushes water into the surrounding tissue spaces, keeping the dermis plump and pressurized. When systemic fluid loss occurs, the body pulls water out of the interstitial spaces to maintain blood pressure and intravascular volume. This drop in interstitial fluid pressure strips the skin of its internal tension, causing the collagen and elastin fibers to lose their structural support and stick togetehr when deformed.

== Pediatric Assessment Techniques ==
In infants and young children, clinical evaluation of skin turgor requires a different approach than in adults due to differences in subcutaneous fat distribution. Medical Professionals perform the pinch test on the child's abdomen or the inner thigh rather than the hand or forearm. A pinch that remains elevated for less than two seconds indicates mild to modern dehydration, while a fold that tents for longer than two seconds signifies severe, life-threatening fluid loss. However, the reliability of this test changes if a child is severely malnourished or obese, as excessive fat can mask poor turgor.

== Confounders and Diagnostic Limitations ==
Several Systemic and age-related factors can severely limit the accuracy of skin turgor as a standalone diagnostic tool. In patients with hypernatremic dehydration, where sodium levels in the blood are abnormally high, water is pulled from the cells into the extracellular spaces, which keeps the skin feeling doughy rather than producing traditional tenting. Conversely, senior citizens naturally experience a sharp decline in dermal collagen synthesis and elastic fibers as they age. This natural loss of skin elasticity causes healthy, well-hydrated older adults to demonstrate prolonged tenting that can mistakenly be read as dehydration.

== Alternative Medical Causes of Altered Turgor ==
Altered skin turgor can be caused by chronic medical conditions completely unrelated to an individual's immediate hydration status. Systemic sclerosis, or scleroderma, is an autoimmune disorder that triggers excessive collage production, resulting in abnormally tight, hard, and shiny skin that exhibits high turgor and cannot be pinched at all. On the other hand, genetic connective tissue disorders can drastically lower baseline skin tension, making the skin hyper-elastic. Additionally, localized fluid retention or severe edema stretches the dermis tightly, masking underlying systemic dehydration by artificially inflating skin turgor measurements.

== Sources ==
- Almalki, T.M.A.; Alshammari, F.O. NURSING CARE IN RENAL FAILURE. JEC PUBLICATION. ISBN 978-93-6175-429-6.
- Liu, Chenbin; Tsow, Francis; Shao, Dangdang; Yang, Yuting; Iriya, Rafael; Tao, Nongjian (2016). "Skin Mechanical Properties and Hydration Measured With Mobile Phone Camera". IEEE Sensors Journal. 16 (4): 924–930. Bibcode:2016ISenJ..16..924L. doi:10.1109/JSEN.2015.2492241. ISSN 1530-437X.
- Saavedra, Jose M. (1991-03-01). "Capillary Refilling (Skin Turgor) in the Assessment of Dehydration". Archives of Pediatrics & Adolescent Medicine. 145 (3): 296–298. doi:10.1001/archpedi.1991.02160030064022. ISSN 1072-4710. PMID 2003478.
