= Permissive hypotension =

Treatment methodology in trauma patients

Permissive hypotension or hypotensive resuscitation is the use of restrictive fluid therapy, specifically in the trauma patient, that increases systemic blood pressure without reaching normotension (normal blood pressures). The goal blood pressure for these patients is a mean arterial pressure of 40-50 mmHg or systolic blood pressure of less than or equal to 80. This goes along with certain clinical criteria. Following traumatic injury, some patients experience hypotension (low blood pressure) that is usually due to blood loss (hemorrhage) but can be due to other causes as well (for example, blood leaking around an abdominal aortic aneurysm). In the past, physicians were very aggressive with fluid resuscitation (giving fluids such as normal saline or lactated Ringer's through the vein) to try to bring the blood pressure to normal values. Recent studies have found that there is some benefit to allowing specific patients to experience some degree of hypotension in certain settings. This concept does not exclude therapy by means of i.v. fluid, inotropes or vasopressors, the only restriction is to avoid completely normalizing blood pressure in a context where blood loss may be enhanced. When a person starts to bleed (big or small) the body starts a natural coagulation process that eventually stops the bleed. Issues with fluid resuscitation without control of bleeding are thought to be secondary to dislodgement of the thrombus (blood clot) that is helping to control further bleeding. Thrombus dislodgement was found to occur at a systolic pressure greater than 80mm Hg. In addition, fluid resuscitation will dilute coagulation factors that help form and stabilize a clot, hence making it harder for the body to use its natural mechanisms to stop the bleeding. These factors are aggravated by hypothermia (if fluids are administered without being warmed first it will cause body temperature to drop).

It is becoming common in hemorrhaging patients without traumatic brain injury. Due to the lack of controlled clinical trials in this field, the growing evidence that hypotensive resuscitation results in improved long-term survival mainly stems from experimental studies in animals. Numerous animal models of uncontrolled hemorrhagic shock have demonstrated improved outcomes when a lower than normal blood pressure (mean arterial pressure of 60 to 70 mmHg) is taken as the target for fluid administration during active hemorrhage. The first published study in humans, in people with penetrating torso trauma, has demonstrated a significant reduction in mortality when fluid resuscitation was restricted in the prehospital period. However, the objective of that study was the comparison between standard prehospital and trauma center fluid resuscitation versus delayed onset of fluid resuscitation (fluid not administered until patients reached the operating room). A more recent study (2011) performed by the Baylor Group on patients who required emergency surgery secondary to hemorrhagic shock was randomized to a mean arterial pressure (MAP) of 50mmHg versus 65mm Hg. The lower MAP group was found to need less total IV fluids, used fewer blood products, had lower early mortality (within the first 24 hours - which accounts for a large portion of mortality in trauma patients) and trended towards lower 30-day mortality and less postoperative coagulation, concluding that permissive hypotension is safe. Two large human trials of this technique have been conducted, which demonstrated the safety of this approach relative to the conventional target (greater than 100 mmHg), and suggested various benefits, including shorter duration of hemorrhage and reduced mortality. Johns Hopkins group performed a retrospective cohort review from National Trauma Data Bank that found a statistically significant difference in mortality for patients treated with pre-hospital intravenous fluids. Clinical data from well-controlled, prospective trials applying the concept of permissive hypotension in trauma patients are still missing.

== Pathophysiology ==
Following injury, the otherwise healthy individual has a natural ability to clot off bleeding. The higher the pressure in your vessels, the harder it is for the bleeding to stop, since the fluid essentially "pushes" the clot out and consequently the bleeding resumes. In more technical terms: hypotension facilitates in vivo coagulation. This is especially true in patients who still have active bleeding. Attempts to normalize blood pressure in case of uncontrolled bleeding as in patients with penetrating trauma, may result in increased blood loss and worse outcomes. In this context, restriction of fluid resuscitation may actually improve outcomes. This concept has been supported by animal studies that have demonstrated aggressive fluid resuscitation increases the volume of hemorrhaging fluid to a significant level as well as increased mortality.

Another issue with aggressive fluid resuscitation is the potential for hypothermia if fluids that are stored at room temperature are used. If these fluids are not warmed prior to infusion (which sometimes time does not permit), this can result in a significant drop in core body temperature. Hypothermia is associated with many problems including a bleeding disorder, organ failure, and hypotension, and is one of the three components in the "Triad of Death" that is feared by all trauma specialists.

The crystalloid fluid used in initial resuscitative efforts does not contain any clotting factors or erythrocytes (red blood cells). Its use may result in a dilution of clotting factors and erythrocytes, and therefore poorer control of bleeding and impaired oxygen transport to tissues causing further ischemic damage. Additionally, crystalloids have an acidic pH, and the administration of large quantities of isotonic or slightly hypertonic crystalloid solutions such as 0.9% normal saline or Lactated Ringer's can cause or aggravate metabolic acidosis, another component of the "Triad of Death" leading to a decrease in myocardial (heart muscle) function.

Permissive hypotension is a temporary measure to improve outcomes until the source of bleeding is controlled. There are issues associated with prolonged permissive hypotension (> 90 min considered prolonged where detrimental effects outweigh benefits according to most recent animal studies - no human data available to date) that must be taken to account. Prolonged permissive hypotension can lead to aggravated post-injury coagulopathy (coagulation dysfunction), ischemic damage secondary to poor tissue perfusion including the brain, mitochondrial dysfunction, and lactic acidosis among others. It is also possible that other substances, such as estrogen (17 beta-estradiol) could allow for longer models of permissive hypotension. In a rat model of hemorrhagic shock, estrogen was able to reduce some of the negative effects of prolonged permissive hypotension as well as prolong long-term survival.

== Contraindications ==
Patients with preexisting hypertension are at higher risk of death and morbidity during permissive hypotension. This is due to the shift in the autoregulatory curve to the right for hypertensive patients.

Permissive hypotension relies on the heart's ability to pump fluid through the body efficiently. Less intravascular fluid results in less fluid filling the heart (lower end diastolic volume) which results in a lower amount of volume pumped out of the heart (stroke volume). This is based on the Frank-Starling law of the heart. Healthy patients should be able to compensate for lower volumes to some extent, but patients with pre-existing cardiovascular disease limiting myocardial function (such as angina pectoris) may not. Applying permissive hypotension to the latter patient category may result in decreased coronary perfusion and result in ischemic damage to the heart and potentially myocardial infarction (heart attack).

Permissive hypotension may also be contraindicated in patients with cerebrovascular disease, carotid artery stenosis, and compromised renal (kidney) function, where hypotension may induce sludge (thickening of the blood) and lead to occlusion of the vessel lumen. It is also recommended that fluid loading should be used, instead of permissive hypotension, for those with crush syndrome.

A high percentage of polytraumatized patients have traumatic brain injury. The results from the Traumatic Coma Data Bank show the influence of the presence or absence of hypotension (defined as one or more recordings of a systolic blood pressure ≤90 mm Hg) or hypoxia (PaO2 <60 mm Hg) at the time of admission) on the outcome of patients with traumatic brain injury and hypotension at admission to the hospital showed twice the mortality and a significant increase in morbidity when compared with patients who were normotensive. The concomitant presence of hypoxia and hypotension upon admission resulted in a 75% mortality. Evidence strongly suggests that the avoidance or minimization of hypotension during the acute and postinjury period following traumatic brain injury had the highest likelihood of improving outcomes of any one single therapeutic maneuver. Therefore, managing a patient with traumatic brain injury and continuing bleeding elsewhere becomes a balance between meeting the demands of the brain versus the demands of the body, which should be addressed by the experienced anesthesiologist, surgeon and emergency physician.

== Current Recommendations ==
- UK - Resuscitation to maintain a palpable radial pulse (indicative of systolic blood pressure 80-90mm Hg) in ongoing hemorrhage in soldiers and to maintain only a palpable central pulse (ex. carotid), indicative of systolic blood pressure of 60mm Hg with penetrating torso trauma.
- United States - US Military follows permissive hypotension. Any patient that experiences altered mental status or becomes unconscious (systolic blood pressure less than or equal to 50mmHg) is resuscitated to restore mentation or systolic blood pressure of 70mmHg.
- Israel - Israeli Military also follows permissive hypotension and follows similar guidelines as the United States.
