= Capillary refill =

Medical term

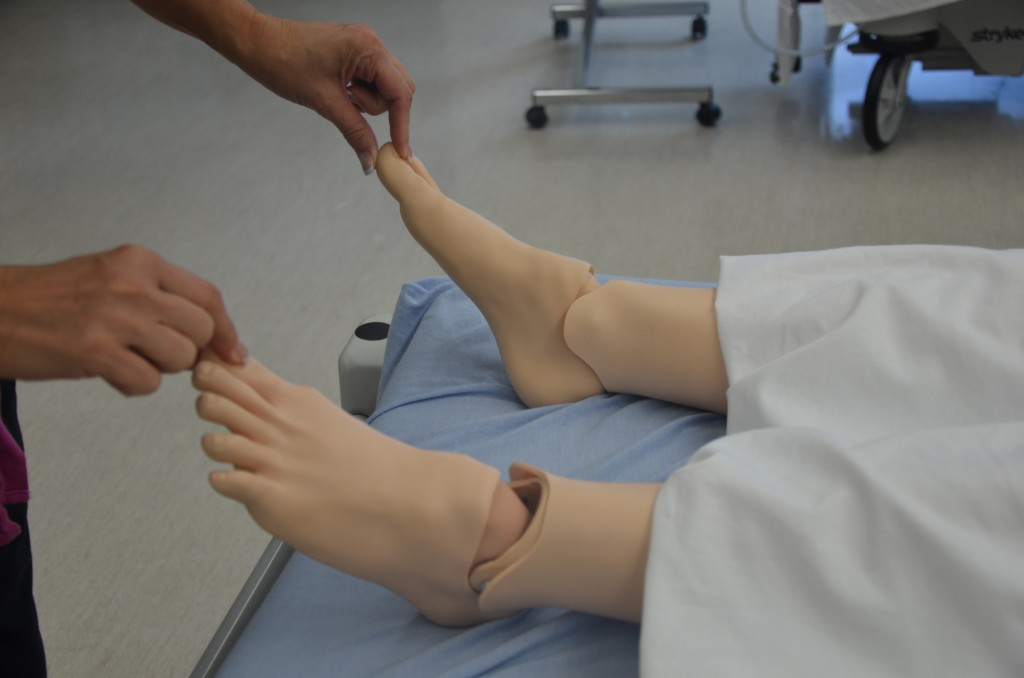
A person demonstrates how to assess capillary refill time (CRT) on a dummy

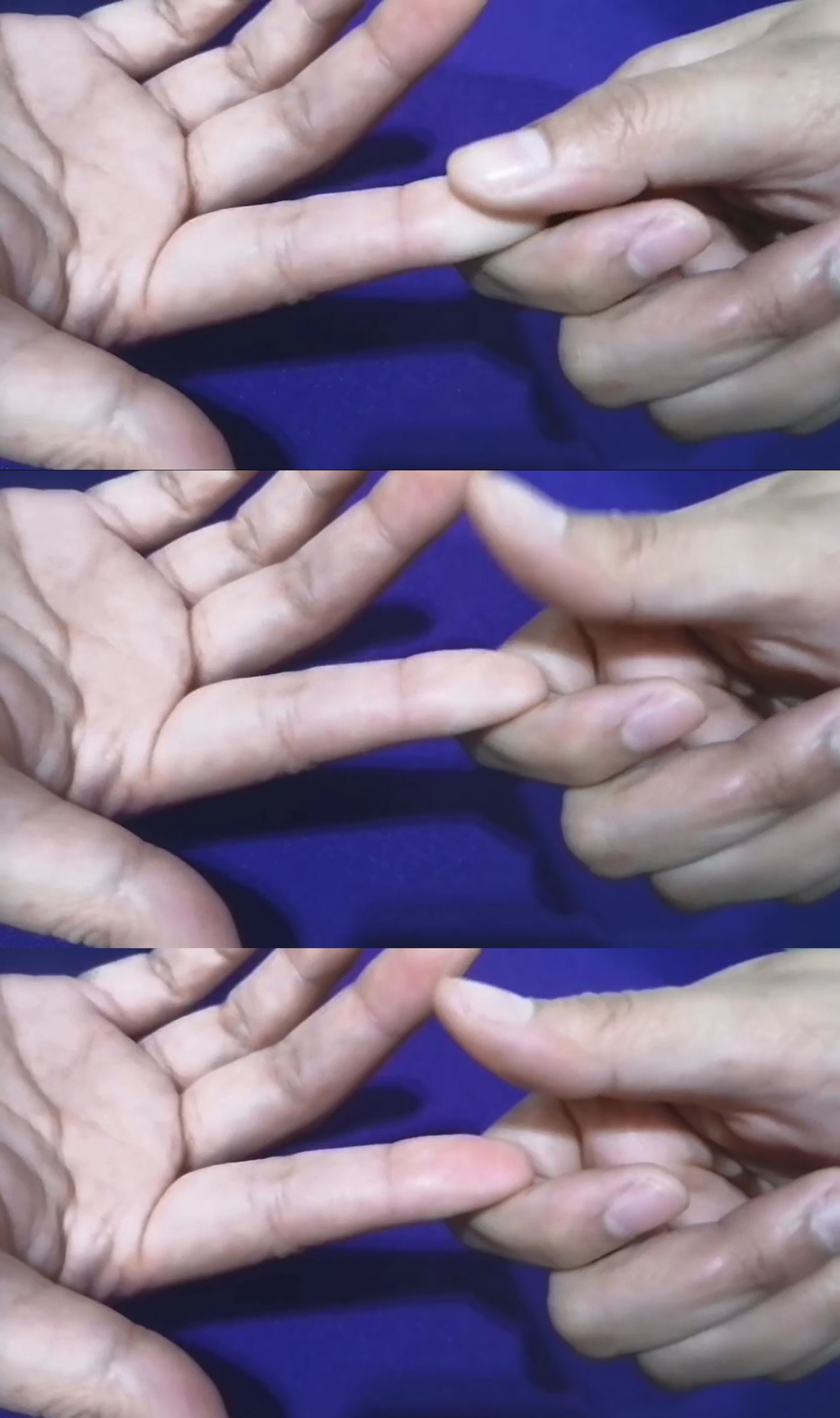
Capillary refill test on index finger pulp.

Capillary refill time (CRT) is defined as the time taken for color to return to an external capillary bed after pressure is applied to cause blanching. It can be measured by holding a hand higher than heart-level and pressing the soft pad of a finger or fingernail until it turns white, then taking note of the time needed for the color to return once pressure is released. In humans, a CRT of more than three seconds indicates decreased peripheral perfusion and may indicate cardiovascular or respiratory dysfunction.

== Assessment ==
=== In adults ===
CRT can be measured by applying pressure to the pad of a finger or toe for 5–10 seconds. It became popularized in the 1980s when Champion et al. proposed a CRT of less than 2 seconds be deemed normal and included CRT in the Trauma Score. The value of 2 seconds for a normal CRT that was proposed by Dr Champion had been arbitrarily chosen by his nurse, and no evidence supporting that value has subsequently been found. CRT has been shown to be influenced by ambient temperature, age, sex, skin color, and the anatomical testing and lighting conditions. The most reliable and applicable site for CRT testing is the finger pulp (not at the fingernail), and the cut-off value for the normal CRT should be 3 seconds, not 2 seconds.

To assess shock, central CRT, which is done by assessing capillary refill time at the sternum, rather than finger CRT, is more useful.

=== In infants ===
In newborn infants, capillary refill time can be measured by pressing on the sternum for five seconds with a finger or thumb, and noting the time needed for the color to return once the pressure is released (central CRT). The upper normal limit for capillary refill in newborns is 3 seconds. A prolonged capillary refill time may be a sign of shock and can also indicate dehydration and may be a sign of dengue hemorrhagic fever and decreased peripheral perfusion. Prolonged capillary refill time may also suggest peripheral artery disease. It is generally accepted that the test is affected by many different external factors and therefore should not be relied upon as a universal diagnostic measure.

=== In animals ===
Capillary refill time is also used in veterinary medicine. An animal should have a capillary refill time of less than 1 to 1 3/4 of a second. Because animals have fur, the gums are typically used to test capillary refill time.

== Use ==
Capillary refill time is a quick and cheap way to indicate decreased peripheral perfusion and may indicate cardiovascular or respiratory dysfunction. It has also been used to assess or diagnose diseases of the peripheral circulatory system such as Raynaud's syndrome and hand–arm vibration syndrome. Poor finger or toe capillary refill time is a contraindication for the use of compressive techniques to treat peripheral oedema. Capillary refill time is also traditionally used as a clinical indicator of tissue vascularity either after limb injury or after revascularization.

There is disagreement as to whether the test is useful, however, and it is poorly standardised. Inter-rater reliability is often poor, caused by different lighting conditions and variable pressure that substantially change CRT results from person to person.

However, CRT can still be a useful test, especially for conditions of septic shock, where markers such as serum lactate levels take time to analyze. The ANDROMEDA-SHOCK-2 trial saw better patient outcomes by using CRT as a target for septic shock resuscitation compared to the usual standard of care.

In veterinary medicine, poor gum CRT may be an contraindication for use of anaesthesia, as the likelihood of anaesthesia being fatal is higher if there is an underlying heart or lung problem. Gum CRT may also be used to monitor health during anaesthesia.

== See also ==
- Peripheral vascular examination
- Skin turgor
