= Thioredoxin domain =

Thioredoxin

Identifiers
- Symbol: Thioredoxin
- Pfam: PF00085
- InterPro: IPR013766
- PROSITE: PDOC00172
- SCOP2: 3trx / SCOPe / SUPFAM
- CDD: cd01659
- Membranome: 337
Available protein structures:
- PDB: IPR013766 PF00085 (ECOD; PDBsum)
- AlphaFold: IPR013766; PF00085

The thioredoxin domain is a protein domain found in thioredoxins and a number of related proteins, which is part of the larger thioredoxin fold superfamily. Thioredoxins are small disulfide-containing redox proteins that have been found in all the kingdoms of living organisms, and consist of thioredoxin and thioredoxin 2 in humans.

Thioredoxins serve as a general protein disulfide oxidoreductase. They interact with a broad range of proteins by a redox mechanism based on reversible oxidation of 2 cysteine thiol groups to a disulfide, accompanied by the transfer of 2 electrons and 2 protons. The net result is the covalent interconversion of a disulfide and a dithiol.

TR-S_{2} + NADPH + H^{+} -> TR-(SH)_{2} + NADP^{+} (1)

trx-S_{2} + TR-(SH)_{2} -> trx-(SH)_{2} + TR-S_{2} (2)

Protein-S_{2} + trx-(SH)_{2} -> Protein-(SH)_{2} + trx-S_{2} (3)

In the NADPH-dependent protein disulfide reduction, thioredoxin reductase (TR) catalyses reduction of oxidised thioredoxin (trx) by NADPH using FAD and its redox-active disulfide (steps 1 and 2). Reduced thioredoxin then directly reduces the disulfide in the substrate protein (step 3).

Protein disulfide isomerase (PDI), a resident foldase of the endoplasmic reticulum, is a multi-functional protein that catalyses the formation and isomerisation of disulfide bonds during protein folding. PDI contains 2 redox active domains, near the N- and C-termini, that are similar to thioredoxin: both contribute to disulfide isomerase activity, but are functionally non-equivalent. A mutant PDI, with all 4 of the active cysteines replaced by serine, displays a low but detectable level of disulfide isomerase activity. Moreover, PDI exhibits chaperone-like activity towards proteins that contain no disulfide bonds, i.e. behaving independently of its disulfide isomerase activity.

A number of endoplasmic reticulum proteins that differ from the PDI major isozyme contain 2 (ERp60, ERp5) or 3 (ERp72) thioredoxin domains; all of them seem to be PDIs. 3D-structures have been determined for a number of thioredoxins. The molecule has a doubly wound alternating alpha/beta fold, consisting of a 5-stranded parallel beta-sheet core, enclosed by 4 alpha-helices. The active site disulfide is located at the N-terminus of helix 2 in a short segment that is separated from the rest of the helix by a kink caused by a conserved proline. The 4-membered disulfide ring is located on the surface of the protein. A flat hydrophobic surface lies adjacent to the disulfide, which presumably facilitates interaction with other proteins.

One invariant feature of all thioredoxins is a cis-proline located in a loop preceding beta-strand 4. This residue is positioned in van der Waals contact with the active site cysteines and is important both for stability and function. Thioredoxin belongs to a structural family that includes glutaredoxin, glutathione peroxidase, bacterial protein disulfide isomerase DsbA, and the N-terminal domain of glutathione transferase. Thioredoxins have a beta-alpha unit preceding the motif common to all these proteins.

== Human proteins containing thioredoxin domain ==
DNAJC10; ERP70; GLRX3; P4HB; PDIA2 (PDIP); PDIA3; PDIA4; PDIA5; PDIA6; PDILT; QSOX1; QSOX2; STRF8; TXN; TXN2; TXNDC1; TXNDC10; TXNDC11; TXNDC13; TXNDC14; TXNDC15; TXNDC16; TXNDC2; TXNDC3; TXNDC4; TXNDC5; TXNDC6; TXNDC8; TXNL1; TXNL3; NXN;
