= Thioredoxin fold =

Type of protein fold

Thioredoxin
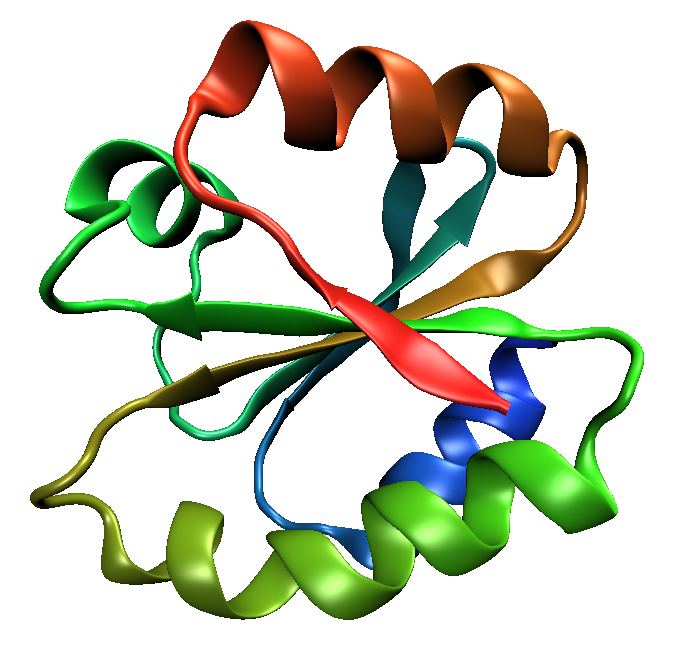
- One molecule of human thioredoxin (PDB ID 1ERT), a canonical example of the thioredoxin fold class.

Identifiers
- Symbol: Thioredoxin, Trx
- Pfam: PF00085
- Pfam clan: CL0172
- ECOD: 2485.1.1
- InterPro: IPR013766
- PROSITE: PDOC00172
- SCOP2: 3trx / SCOPe / SUPFAM
- CDD: cd01659
- Membranome: 337
Available protein structures:
- PDB: IPR013766 PF00085 (ECOD; PDBsum)
- AlphaFold: IPR013766; PF00085

Thioredoxin

Identifiers
- Symbol: Trx
- Membranome: 260

The thioredoxin fold is a protein fold common to enzymes that catalyze disulfide bond formation and isomerization. The fold is named for the canonical example thioredoxin and is found in both prokaryotic and eukaryotic proteins. It is an example of an alpha/beta protein fold that has oxidoreductase activity. The fold's spatial topology consists of a four-stranded antiparallel beta sheet sandwiched between three alpha helices. The strand topology is 2134 with 3 antiparallel to the rest.

== Sequence conservation ==
Despite sequence variability in many regions of the fold, thioredoxin proteins share a common active site sequence with two reactive cysteine residues: Cys-X-Y-Cys, where X and Y are often but not necessarily hydrophobic amino acids. The reduced form of the protein contains two free thiol groups at the cysteine residues, whereas the oxidized form contains a disulfide bond between them.

== Disulfide bond formation ==
Different thioredoxin fold-containing proteins vary greatly in their reactivity and in the pKa of their free thiols, which derives from the ability of the overall protein structure to stabilize the activated thiolate. Although the structure is fairly consistent among proteins containing the thioredoxin fold, the pKa is extremely sensitive to small variations in structure, especially in the placement of protein backbone atoms near the first cysteine.

== Examples ==
Human proteins containing this domain include:

- DNAJC10
- ERP70
- GLRX3
- P4HB; PDIA2; PDIA3; PDIA4; PDIA5; PDIA6 (P5); PDILT
- QSOX1; QSOX2
- STRF8
- TXN; TXN2; TXNDC1; TXNDC10; TXNDC11; TXNDC13; TXNDC14; TXNDC15; TXNDC16; TXNDC2; TXNDC3; TXNDC4; TXNDC5; TXNDC6; TXNDC8; TXNL1; TXNL3
