= Protein disulfide-isomerase =

Class of enzymes

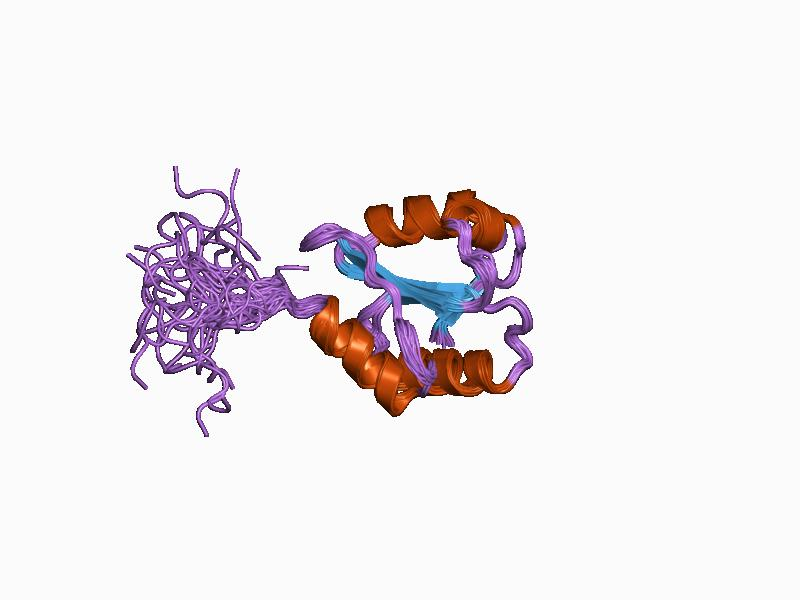
- Structural picture of human protein disulfide isomerase (PDB 1BJX)

Identifiers
- Symbol: ?
- InterPro: IPR005792
Available protein structures:
- PDB: IPR005792
- AlphaFold: IPR005792

Protein disulfide-isomerase

Identifiers
- EC no.: 5.3.4.1
- CAS no.: 37318-49-3

Databases
- BRENDA: enzyme data
- ExPASy: NiceZyme view
- KEGG: enzyme entry
- MetaCyc: metabolic pathway
- Rhea: reactions
- PDB structures: RCSB PDB PDBe PDBsum
- Gene Ontology: AmiGO / QuickGO
Search
- PMC: articles
- PubMed: articles
- NCBI: proteins

protein disulfide isomerase family A, member 2

Identifiers
- Symbol: PDIA2
- Alt. symbols: PDIP
- NCBI gene: 64714
- HGNC: 14180
- OMIM: 608012
- RefSeq: NM_006849
- UniProt: Q13087

Other data
- Locus: Chr. 16 p13.3
Search for
- Structures: Swiss-model
- Domains: InterPro

protein disulfide isomerase family A, member 3

Identifiers
- Symbol: PDIA3
- Alt. symbols: GRP58
- NCBI gene: 2923
- HGNC: 4606
- OMIM: 602046
- RefSeq: NM_005313
- UniProt: P30101

Other data
- Locus: Chr. 15 q15
Search for
- Structures: Swiss-model
- Domains: InterPro

protein disulfide isomerase family A, member 4

Identifiers
- Symbol: PDIA4
- NCBI gene: 9601
- HGNC: 30167
- RefSeq: NM_004911
- UniProt: P13667

Other data
- Locus: Chr. 7 q35
Search for
- Structures: Swiss-model
- Domains: InterPro

protein disulfide isomerase family A, member 5

Identifiers
- Symbol: PDIA5
- NCBI gene: 10954
- HGNC: 24811
- RefSeq: NM_006810
- UniProt: Q14554

Other data
- EC number: 5.3.4.1
- Locus: Chr. 3 q21.1
Search for
- Structures: Swiss-model
- Domains: InterPro

protein disulfide isomerase family A, member 6

Identifiers
- Symbol: PDIA6
- Alt. symbols: TXNDC7
- NCBI gene: 10130
- HGNC: 30168
- RefSeq: NM_005742
- UniProt: Q15084

Other data
- Locus: Chr. 2 p25.1
Search for
- Structures: Swiss-model
- Domains: InterPro

Protein disulfide isomerase (EC 5.3.4.1), or PDI, is an enzyme in the endoplasmic reticulum (ER) in eukaryotes and the periplasm of bacteria that catalyzes the formation and breakage of disulfide bonds between cysteine residues within proteins as they fold. This allows proteins to quickly find the correct arrangement of disulfide bonds in their fully folded state, and therefore the enzyme acts to catalyze protein folding.

== Structure ==
Protein disulfide-isomerase has two catalytic thioredoxin-like domains (active sites), each containing the canonical CGHC motif, and two non catalytic domains. This structure is similar to the structure of enzymes responsible for oxidative folding in the intermembrane space of the mitochondria; an example of this is mitochondrial IMS import and assembly (Mia40), which has 2 catalytic domains that contain a CX_{9}C, which is similar to the CGHC domain of PDI. Bacterial DsbA, responsible for oxidative folding, also has a thioredoxin CXXC domain.

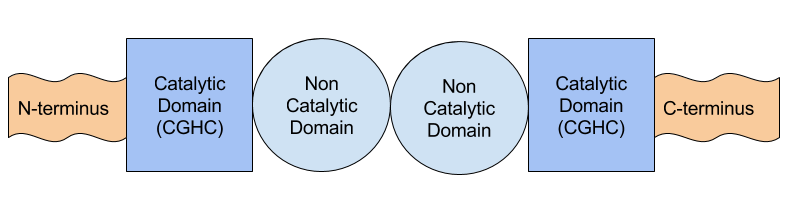
Primary structure of protein disulfide isomerase with sequence of domains

== Function ==
=== Protein folding ===
PDI displays oxidoreductase and isomerase properties, both of which depend on the type of substrate that binds to protein disulfide-isomerase and changes in protein disulfide-isomerase's redox state. These types of activities allow for oxidative folding of proteins. Oxidative folding involves the oxidation of reduced cysteine residues of nascent proteins; upon oxidation of these cysteine residues, disulfide bridges are formed, which stabilizes proteins and allows for native structures (namely tertiary and quaternary structures). In line with this, zinc ions bind PDIA1 in a redox-dependent manner—both reduced and oxidized forms bind Zn²⁺, but with distinct stoichiometries—leading to pronounced effects on conformational stability (including shifts in thermal denaturation transitions) and inhibiting the thiol-reductase activity of the reduced enzyme.

==== Regular oxidative folding mechanism and pathway ====
PDI is specifically responsible for folding proteins in the ER. In an unfolded protein, a cysteine residue forms a mixed disulfide with a cysteine residue in an active site (CGHC motif) of protein disulfide-isomerase. A second cysteine residue then forms a stable disulfide bridge within the substrate, leaving protein disulfide-isomerase's two active-site cysteine residues in a reduced state.

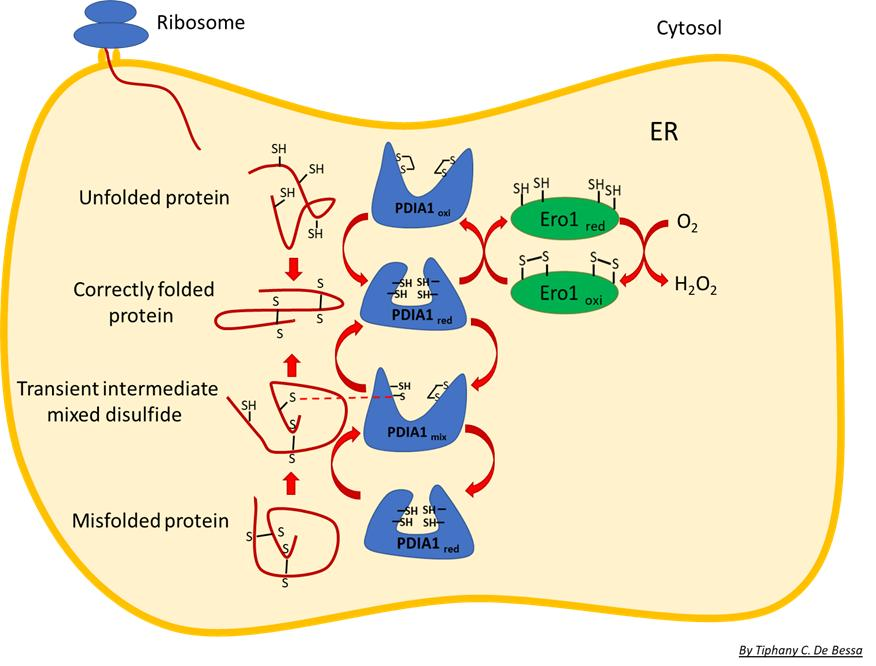

Afterwards, PDI can be regenerated to its oxidized form in the endoplasmic reticulum by transferring electrons to reoxidizing proteins such ER oxidoreductin 1 (Ero 1), VKOR (vitamin K epoxide reductase), glutathione peroxidase (Gpx7/8), and PrxIV (peroxiredoxin IV). Ero1 is thought to be the main reoxidizing protein of PDI, and the pathway of reoxidation of PDI for Ero1 is more understood than that of other proteins. Ero1 accepts electrons from PDI and donates these electrons to oxygen molecules in the ER, which leads to the formation of hydrogen peroxide.

==== Misfolded protein mechanism ====
The reduced (dithiol) form of protein disulfide-isomerase is able to catalyze a reduction of a misformed disulfide bridge of a substrate through either reductase activity or isomerase activity. For the reductase method, a misfolded substrate disulfide bond is converted to a pair of reduced cysteine residues by the transfer of electrons from glutathione and NADPH. Afterwards, normal folding occurs with oxidative disulfide bond formation between the correct pairs of substrate cysteine residues, leading to a properly folded protein. For the isomerase method, intramolecular rearrangement of substrate functional groups is catalyzed near the N terminus of each active site. Therefore, protein disulfide-isomerase is capable of catalyzing the post-translational modification disulfide exchange.

=== Redox signaling ===
In the chloroplasts of the unicellular algae Chlamydomonas reinhardtii the protein disulfide-isomerase RB60 serves as a redox sensor component of an mRNA-binding protein complex implicated in the photoregulation of the translation of psbA, the RNA encoding for the photosystem II core protein D1. Protein disulfide-isomerase has also been suggested to play a role in the formation of regulatory disulfide bonds in chloroplasts.

=== Other functions ===
==== Immune system ====
Protein disulfide-isomerase helps load antigenic peptides into MHC class I molecules. These molecules (MHC I) are related to the peptide presentation by antigen-presenting cells in the immune response.

Protein disulfide-isomerase has been found to be involved in the breaking of bonds on the HIV gp120 protein during HIV infection of CD4 positive cells, and is required for HIV infection of lymphocytes and monocytes. Some studies have shown it to be available for HIV infection on the surface of the cell clustered around the CD4 protein. Yet conflicting studies have shown that it is not available on the cell surface, but instead is found in significant amounts in the blood plasma.

==== Chaperone activity ====
Another major function of protein disulfide-isomerase relates to its activity as a chaperone; its b' domain aids in the binding of misfolded protein for subsequent degradation. This is regulated by three ER membrane proteins, Protein Kinase RNA-like endoplasmic reticulum kinase (PERK), inositol-requiring kinase 1 (IRE1), and activating transcription factor 6 (ATF6). They respond to high levels of misfolded proteins in the ER through intracellular signaling cascades that can activate PDI's chaperone activity. These signals can also inactivate translation of these misfolded proteins, because the cascade travels from the ER to the nucleus.

== Activity assays ==
Insulin turbidity assay: protein disulfide-isomerase breaks the two disulfide bonds between two insulin (a and b) chains that results in precipitation of b chain. This precipitation can be monitored at 650 nm, which is indirectly used to monitor protein disulfide-isomerase activity. Sensitivity of this assay is in micromolar range.

ScRNase assay: protein disulfide-isomerase converts scrambled (inactive) RNase into native (active) RNase that further acts on its substrate. The sensitivity is in micromolar range.

Di-E-GSSG assay: This is the fluorometric assay that can detect picomolar quantities of protein disulfide-isomerase and therefore is the most sensitive assay to date for detecting protein disulfide-isomerase activity. Di-E-GSSG has two eosin molecules attached to oxidized glutathione (GSSG). The proximity of eosin molecules leads to the quenching of its fluorescence. However, upon breakage of disulfide bond by protein disulfide-isomerase, fluorescence increases 70-fold.

== Stress and inhibition ==
=== Effects of nitrosative stress ===
Redox dysregulation leads to increases in nitrosative stress in the endoplasmic reticulum. Such adverse changes in the normal cellular environment of susceptible cells, such as neurons, leads to nonfunctioning thiol-containing enzymes. More specifically, protein disulfide-isomerase can no longer fix misfolded proteins once its thiol group in its active site has a nitric monoxide group attached to it; as a result, accumulation of misfolded proteins occurs in neurons, which has been associated with the development of neurodegenerative diseases such as Alzheimer's disease and Parkinson's disease.

=== Inhibition ===
Due to the role of protein disulfide-isomerase in a number of disease states, small molecule inhibitors of protein disulfide-isomerase have been developed. These molecules can either target the active site of protein disulfide-isomerase irreversibly or reversibly.

It has been shown that protein disulfide-isomerase activity is inhibited by red wine and grape juice, which could be the explanation for the French paradox.

== Members ==
Human genes encoding protein disulfide isomerases include:

- AGR2
- AGR3
- CASQ1
- CASQ2
- DNAJC10
- ERP27
- ERP29
- ERP44
- P4HB
- PDIA2
- PDIA3
- PDIA4
- PDIA5
- PDIA6
- PDIALT
- TMX1
- TMX2
- TMX3
- TMX4
- TXNDC5
- TXNDC12
