= Adenylyl-sulfate reductase (thioredoxin) =

Enzyme

adenylyl-sulfate reductase (thioredoxin)

Identifiers
- EC no.: 1.8.4.10

Databases
- IntEnz: IntEnz view
- BRENDA: BRENDA entry
- ExPASy: NiceZyme view
- KEGG: KEGG entry
- MetaCyc: metabolic pathway
- PRIAM: profile
- PDB structures: RCSB PDB PDBe PDBsum
- Gene Ontology: AmiGO / QuickGO
Search
- PMC: articles
- PubMed: articles
- NCBI: proteins

Adenylyl-sulfate reductase (thioredoxin) (EC 1.8.4.10) is an enzyme that catalyzes the chemical reaction

AMP + sulfite + thioredoxin disulfide $\rightleftharpoons$ 5'-adenylyl sulfate + thioredoxin

The 3 substrates of this enzyme are adenosine monophosphate, sulfite, and thioredoxin disulfide, whereas its two products are 5'-adenylyl sulfate and thioredoxin.

This enzyme belongs to the family of oxidoreductases, specifically those acting on a sulfur group of donors with a disulfide as acceptor.

This enzyme also assists a feature of the Calvin-Benson cycle's light regulation within the ferredoxin-thioredoxin system in the form of reduced thioredoxin. Thioredoxin-type adenylyl-sulfate reductase also uses thioredoxin as an electron donor in reactions related to protein synthesis. Note this is a general pathway and other resemblances are studied in literature to support this. The enzyme functions in reactions that in the end stabilize Thiols in related bonds that end up forming a dithiol group as a byproduct.

== Nomenclature ==
The systematic name of this enzyme class is AMP, sulfite:thioredoxin-disulfide oxidoreductase (adenosine-5'-phosphosulfate-forming). This enzyme is also called thioredoxin-dependent 5'-adenylylsulfate reductase.

== Classification ==
This enzyme (Adenylyl-sulfate reductase) is an oxidoreductase (Class 1) or more specifically a sulfur oxidoreductase (Sub-Class 8) disulfide (Sub-Subclass 4). The enzyme bears the serial number of 10 under the EC naming system. The primary difference that this particular adenylyl-sulfate reductase from others is it uses thioredoxin as an electron donor instead of other donors such as glutathione (see Adenylyl-sulfate reductase (glutathione)).

== Structural studies ==
As of late 2011, according to model version updates within the Protein Data Bank, only one structure has been solved for this class of enzymes, with the PDB accession code 2GOY. The structure generally is tetrameric in nature with each monomeric composed of several helical β-sheet proteins with α-helical proteins in tow. The enzyme structure can be viewed on the PDB page.

== Active site ==
The active site just as its glutaredoxin counterpart, contains a single cysteine based protein where the thioredoxin binds during electron donation. This including most other adenylyl-sulfate reductases The active site cleft is formed in the center of the enzyme's structure and is notably deep allowing for larger internal surface area for thioredoxin or other substrate binding, on any given protein subunit of the tetramer. The substrate binds onto the C-terminal side of the β-chains within the clef mediated by cysteines. There area few other parts of the synaptic cleft formed between certain loops, such as the "P loop" and the "LDTG motif", noted in some literature with these denotation, each of which contain cysteine number 256 which is important in APS initiated analysis although traditionally considered disordered within the context of the adenylyl sulfate-reductase structure.

== Species distribution ==
Many organisms use this enzyme, primarily plants as mentioned and many microorganisms such as E. coli and fungal plant rhizobia.

E. coli is experimentally found to harness this enzyme with variants associated with serine and cysteine residues and is inherently involved within its own intermediate and its stabilization with the up-taking of the adenylyl sulfate-reductase and thioredoxin produced by P. aeruginosa.

This enzyme is also found in several forms of mycobacteria and other fungi including, as mentioned, rhizobia. Rhizobia use the same pathway but some such as Rhizobium meliloti have a limited genetic scope that would result in adenylyl-sulfate reductase production with the genes only appearing on a few loci, but is used in primarily the same way as in bacterial organisms for the production of a small selection of amino acids.

== Function ==
The structure of adenylyl sulfate-reductase (thioredoxin) has been experimentally shown to follow an open-close system during the reaction when binding the substrate into the active site cleft. When the thioredoxin is detected by the enzyme, the C-terminal tail moves over the active site and forms a closed position within the enzyme itself, allowing for the cysteines that are catalytically necessary to move in and make sufficient contact with the thioredoxin. This action only occurs upon substrate binding. It's important to note that further research still is being completed onto the conformational shifts during the reduction reaction upon thioredoxin binding. However, it is suggested that other conformational steps are needed in order for the intermediate to complete binding to the thioredoxin. These evidence-based speculations consider the evolution of other bacteria that may have reacted with this enzyme or another metabolite over time.

In unicellular organisms such as mycobacteria, one use of this enzyme is in the production of certain proteins, primarily types that either involve or lead to the eventual amino acids cysteine and then methionine.

The thioredoxin dependent adenylyl-sulfate reductase's cleaved disulfuric ions are incorporated into the molecular structure of the proto-proteins in the formation of the aforementioned amino acids. In studies such as one published in the Journal of Biological Chemistry experimentally observed the use of this enzyme type and thioredoxin in the synthesis of the above mentioned proteins within mycobacteria. The working pathway that was considered in this study uses thioredoxin dependent adenylyl-sulfate reductase catalyzes the conversion of 5'-adenosinephosphosulfate into 5′-phosphosulfate. The 5'-phosphosulfate is then changed into 3′-phosphoadenosine 5′-phosphate and sulfite similarly to the general pathway that is a result of the combined products mentioned in the general reaction of adenylyl-sulfate reductase, regardless of the electron donor used. The resulting sulfite post-reaction is commonly used in Cysteine/Methionine production within cells utilizing this enzyme.
