= EXS4318 =

EXS4318 is a selective PKC theta inhibitor that is potentially first-in-class medication. Developed by Exscientia, it was licensed to Bristol Myers Squibb. In 2023, it entered clinical trials in humans.
