= ERP29 =

Protein-coding gene in humans

ERp29
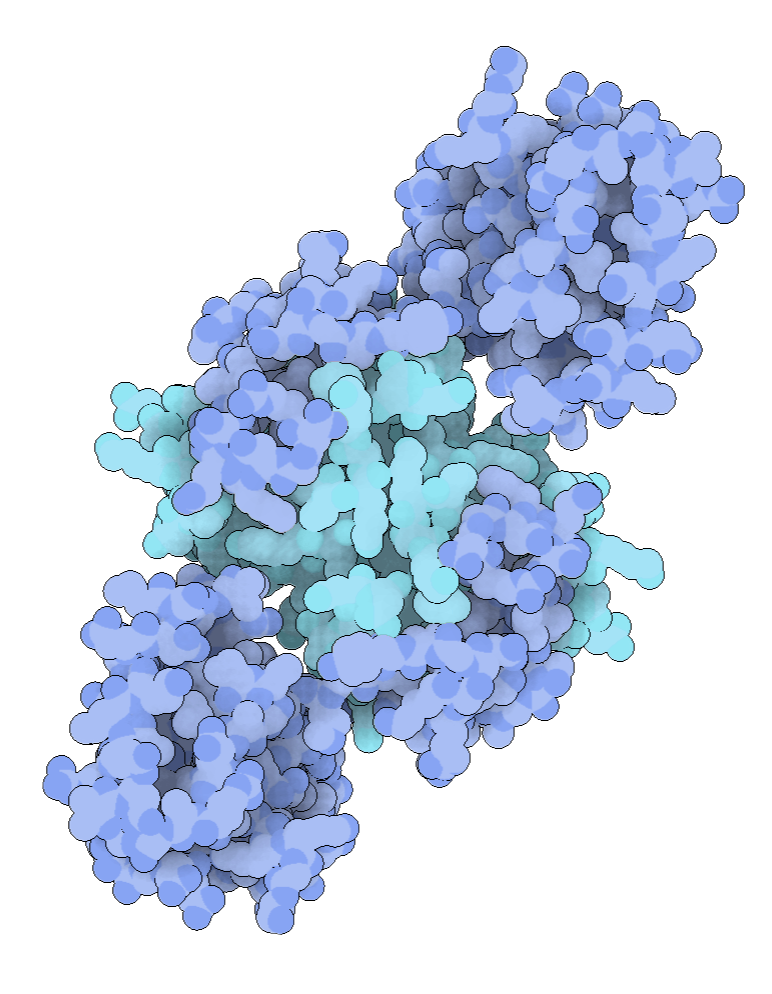

Identifiers
- Aliases: ERP29, C12orf8, ERp28, ERp31, HEL-S-107, PDI-DB, PDIA9, endoplasmic reticulum protein 29
- External IDs: OMIM: 602287; MGI: 1914647; GeneCards: ERP29
Available structures
| PDB | Ortholog search: PDBe RCSB |
| PDB | List of PDB id codes 2QC7 |

Gene location (Human)
| Chr. | Chromosome 12 (human) |
| Band | 12q24.13 | Start | 112,013,348 bp |
| Band | 12q24.13 | End | 112,023,449 bp |

Gene location (Mouse)
| Chr. | Chromosome 5 (mouse) |
| Band | 5|5 F | Start | 121,566,653 bp |
| Band | 5|5 F | End | 121,590,569 bp |
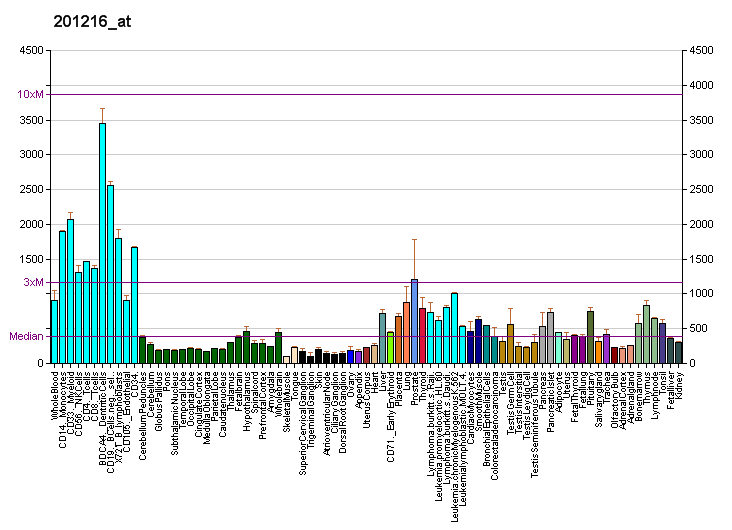
RNA expression pattern
| Bgee | Human / Mouse (ortholog); Top expressed in: monocyte; beta cell; trachea; cardia; granulocyte; body of pancreas; pylorus; thymus; bone marrow cell; nipple / Top expressed in: supraoptic nucleus; lip; superior surface of tongue; yolk sac; corneal stroma; gallbladder; right kidney; placenta; dentate gyrus of hippocampal formation granule cell; ankle joint; More reference expression data |
| BioGPS | More reference expression data |
Gene ontology
| Molecular function | chaperone binding; protein homodimerization activity; protein disulfide isomerase activity; protein binding |
| Cellular component | endoplasmic reticulum lumen; membrane; melanosome; transport vesicle; smooth endoplasmic reticulum; cell surface; endoplasmic reticulum; extracellular exosome |
| Biological process | positive regulation of protein phosphorylation; regulation of endoplasmic reticulum stress-induced intrinsic apoptotic signaling pathway; negative regulation of gene expression; protein secretion; positive regulation of gene expression; protein unfolding; intracellular protein transport; negative regulation of protein secretion; protein folding |
Sources:Amigo / QuickGO
Orthologs
| Databases | NCBI: entry; OMA: entry |
| Species | Human | Mouse |
| Entrez | 10961 | 67397 |
| Ensembl | ENSG00000089248 | ENSMUSG00000029616 |
| UniProt | P30040 | P57759 |
| RefSeq (mRNA) | NM_006817; NM_001034025 | NM_026129 |
| RefSeq (protein) | NP_001029197; NP_006808 | NP_080405 |
| Location (UCSC) | Chr 12: 112.01 – 112.02 Mb | Chr 5: 121.57 – 121.59 Mb |
| PubMed search |
- Wikidata
| View/Edit Human | View/Edit Mouse |

Endoplasmic reticulum protein 29 (ERp29) is a chaperone protein that in humans is encoded by the ERP29 gene.

== Function ==
ERp29 is a reticuloplasmin, a protein which resides in the lumen of the endoplasmic reticulum (ER). The protein shows sequence similarity to the protein disulfide-isomerase family. However, it lacks the thioredoxin motif characteristic of this family, suggesting that this protein does not function as a disulfide isomerase. The protein dimerizes and is thought to play a role in the processing of secretory proteins within the ER. Alternative splicing results in multiple transcript variants encoding different isoforms.
