= L-methionine (R)-S-oxide reductase =

Identifiers
- EC no.: 1.8.4.14

Databases
- IntEnz: IntEnz view
- BRENDA: BRENDA entry
- ExPASy: NiceZyme view
- KEGG: KEGG entry
- MetaCyc: metabolic pathway
- PRIAM: profile
- PDB structures: RCSB PDB PDBe PDBsum
Search
- PMC: articles
- PubMed: articles
- NCBI: proteins

In enzymology, a L-methionine (R)-S-oxide reductase (EC 1.8.4.14) is an enzyme that catalyzes the chemical reaction

L-methionine + thioredoxin disulfide + H_{2}O $\rightleftharpoons$ L-methionine (R)-S-oxide + thioredoxin

The 3 substrates of this enzyme are L-methionine, thioredoxin disulfide, and H_{2}O, whereas its two products are L-methionine (R)-S-oxide and thioredoxin.

This enzyme belongs to the family of oxidoreductases, specifically those acting on a sulfur group of donors with a disulfide as acceptor. The systematic name of this enzyme class is L-methionine:thioredoxin-disulfide S-oxidoreductase [L-methionine (R)-S-oxide-forming]. Other names in common use include fRMsr, FRMsr, free met-R-(o) reductase, and free-methionine (R)-S-oxide reductase. This enzyme participates in methionine metabolism.
