= ERO1LB =

Protein-coding gene in humans

ERO1B

Identifiers
- Aliases: ERO1B, ERO1LB, Ero1beta, endoplasmic reticulum oxidoreductase beta, endoplasmic reticulum oxidoreductase 1 beta
- External IDs: OMIM: 615437; MGI: 1914725; GeneCards: ERO1B
Enzyme activity
EC #	BRENDA	ExPASy	KEGG	MetaCyc
1.8.3.2	↗	↗	↗	↗

Gene location (Human)
Chr.	Chromosome 1 (human)
Band	1q42.3	Start	236,214,681 bp
Band	1q42.3	End	236,282,019 bp

Gene location (Mouse)
Chr.	Chromosome 13 (mouse)
Band	13|13 A1	Start	12,580,755 bp
Band	13|13 A1	End	12,626,285 bp
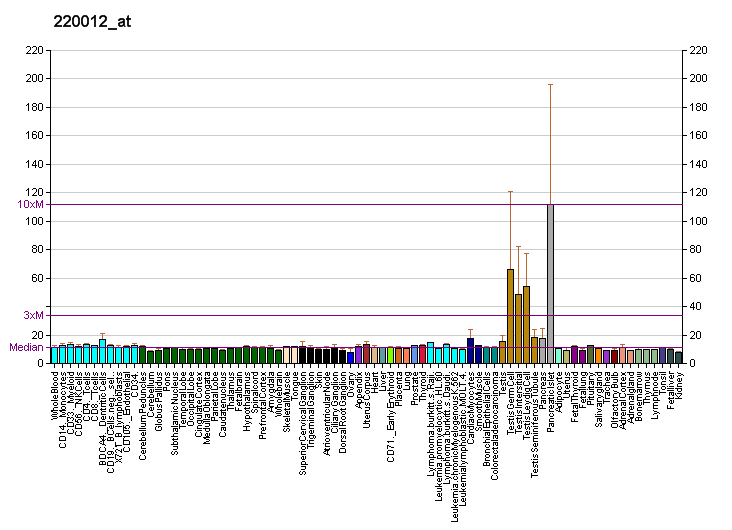
RNA expression pattern
Bgee	Human / Mouse (ortholog); Top expressed in: body of pancreas; islet of Langerhans; secondary oocyte; body of stomach; corpus epididymis; beta cell; endothelial cell; fundus; testicle; right lobe of liver / Top expressed in: islet of Langerhans; lacrimal gland; seminal vesicula; spermatocyte; spermatid; salivary gland; pyloric antrum; submandibular gland; parotid gland; left lobe of liver; More reference expression data
BioGPS	More reference expression data
Gene ontology
Molecular function	unfolded protein binding; oxidoreductase activity, acting on a sulfur group of donors, disulfide as acceptor; oxidoreductase activity; protein binding; protein-disulfide reductase activity; protein disulfide isomerase activity
Cellular component	endoplasmic reticulum; membrane; endoplasmic reticulum membrane
Biological process	insulin processing; 4-hydroxyproline metabolic process; extracellular matrix organization; protein folding; protein maturation by protein folding; glucose homeostasis; cell redox homeostasis; protein folding in endoplasmic reticulum
Sources:Amigo / QuickGO
Orthologs
Databases	NCBI: entry; OMA: entry
Species	Human	Mouse
Entrez	56605	67475
Ensembl	ENSG00000086619	ENSMUSG00000057069
UniProt	Q86YB8	Q8R2E9
RefSeq (mRNA)	NM_019891	NM_026184
RefSeq (protein)	NP_063944	NP_080460
Location (UCSC)	Chr 1: 236.21 – 236.28 Mb	Chr 13: 12.58 – 12.63 Mb
PubMed search
- Wikidata
View/Edit Human	View/Edit Mouse

ERO1-like protein beta is a protein that in humans is encoded by the ERO1LB gene.

== Interactions ==
ERO1LB has been shown to interact with P4HB.
