= ERO1L =

Protein-coding gene in the species Homo sapiens

ERO1A
Available structures
PDB	Ortholog search: PDBe RCSB
PDB	List of PDB id codes 3AHQ, 3AHR

Identifiers
- Aliases: ERO1A, ERO1-alpha, ERO1LA, ERO1-L, ERO1-L-alpha, ERO1L, Ero1alpha, endoplasmic reticulum oxidoreductase alpha, endoplasmic reticulum oxidoreductase 1 alpha
- External IDs: OMIM: 615435; MGI: 1354385; HomoloGene: 49392; GeneCards: ERO1A; OMA:ERO1A - orthologs

Gene location (Human)
Chr.	Chromosome 14 (human)
Band	14q22.1	Start	52,639,915 bp
Band	14q22.1	End	52,695,900 bp

Gene location (Mouse)
Chr.	Chromosome 14 (mouse)
Band	14|14 C1	Start	45,520,544 bp
Band	14|14 C1	End	45,556,228 bp
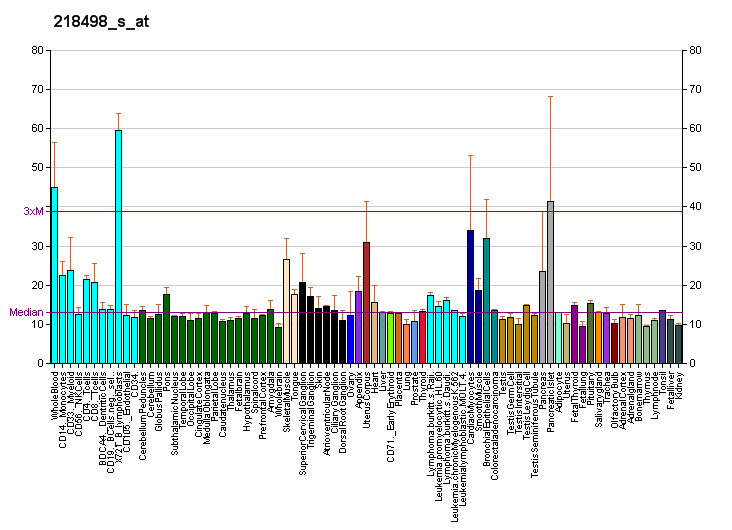
RNA expression pattern
Bgee	Human / Mouse (ortholog); Top expressed in: oral cavity; buccal mucosa cell; mucosa of pharynx; body of tongue; pericardium; tonsil; gums; amniotic fluid; islet of Langerhans; vena cava / Top expressed in: cumulus cell; epithelium of stomach; pyloric antrum; mucous cell of stomach; decidua; gastrula; granulocyte; hair follicle; epithelium of small intestine; tail of embryo; More reference expression data
BioGPS	More reference expression data
Gene ontology
Molecular function	oxidoreductase activity, acting on a sulfur group of donors, disulfide as acceptor; protein binding; oxidoreductase activity; protein-disulfide reductase activity; protein disulfide isomerase activity; disulfide oxidoreductase activity
Cellular component	endoplasmic reticulum lumen; membrane; intracellular membrane-bounded organelle; dendrite; endoplasmic reticulum; endoplasmic reticulum membrane
Biological process	release of sequestered calcium ion into cytosol; 4-hydroxyproline metabolic process; extracellular matrix organization; protein maturation by protein folding; cell redox homeostasis; response to endoplasmic reticulum stress; chaperone cofactor-dependent protein refolding; endoplasmic reticulum unfolded protein response; intrinsic apoptotic signaling pathway in response to endoplasmic reticulum stress; protein folding; brown fat cell differentiation; cellular response to hypoxia; response to temperature stimulus; apoptotic process; protein folding in endoplasmic reticulum; cellular response to oxidative stress
Sources:Amigo / QuickGO
Orthologs
Species	Human	Mouse
Entrez	30001	50527
Ensembl	ENSG00000197930	ENSMUSG00000021831
UniProt	Q96HE7	Q8R180
RefSeq (mRNA)	NM_014584	NM_015774
RefSeq (protein)	NP_055399; NP_001369393; NP_001369394; NP_001369395; NP_001369396 NP_001369397; NP_001369398; NP_001369399; NP_001369400; NP_001369401; NP_001369402; NP_001369403; NP_001369404; NP_001369405	NP_056589
Location (UCSC)	Chr 14: 52.64 – 52.7 Mb	Chr 14: 45.52 – 45.56 Mb
PubMed search
- Wikidata
View/Edit Human	View/Edit Mouse

ERO1-like protein alpha is a protein that in humans is encoded by the ERO1L gene.

== Interactions ==
ERO1L has been shown to interact with TXNDC4 and P4HB.
