= AGR3 =

Protein-coding gene in the species Homo sapiens

Identifiers
- Aliases: AGR3, AG3, BCMP11, HAG3, PDIA18, hAG-3, AG-3, anterior gradient 3, protein disulphide isomerase family member
- External IDs: OMIM: 609482; MGI: 2685734; GeneCards: AGR3
Available structures
PDB	Ortholog search: PDBe RCSB
PDB	List of PDB id codes 3PH9

Gene location (Human)
Chr.	Chromosome 7 (human)
Band	7p21.1	Start	16,859,412 bp
Band	7p21.1	End	16,881,987 bp

Gene location (Mouse)
Chr.	Chromosome 12 (mouse)
Band	12|12 A3	Start	35,975,619 bp
Band	12|12 A3	End	35,999,735 bp
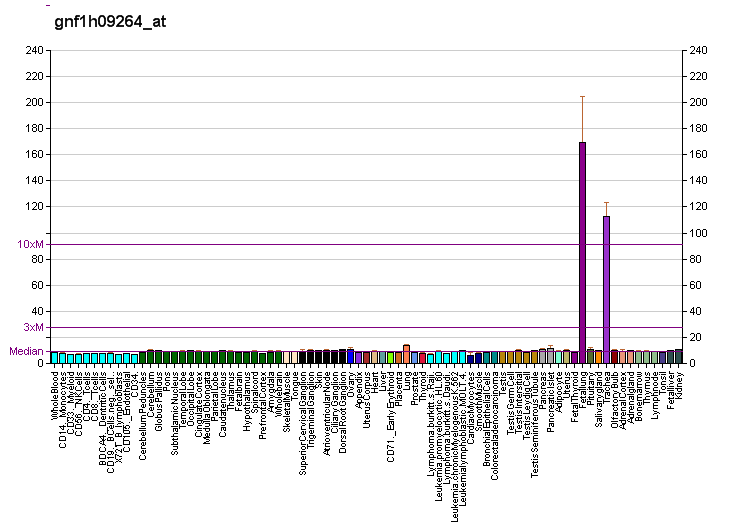
RNA expression pattern
Bgee	Human / Mouse (ortholog); Top expressed in: bronchial epithelial cell; mucosa of ileum; mucosa of sigmoid colon; right uterine tube; rectum; jejunal mucosa; mucosa of transverse colon; pancreatic epithelial cell; duodenum; trachea / Top expressed in: saccule; vestibular sensory epithelium; utricle; olfactory epithelium; primary oocyte; zygote; secondary oocyte; right lung lobe; trachea; cochlea; More reference expression data
BioGPS	More reference expression data
Gene ontology
Molecular function	protein binding; dystroglycan binding
Cellular component	endoplasmic reticulum; cellular component; intracellular membrane-bounded organelle
Biological process	cell differentiation; negative regulation of cell death; biological process
Sources:Amigo / QuickGO
Orthologs
Databases	NCBI: entry; OMA: entry
Species	Human	Mouse
Entrez	155465	403205
Ensembl	ENSG00000173467	ENSMUSG00000036231
UniProt	Q8TD06	Q8R3W7
RefSeq (mRNA)	NM_176813	NM_207531
RefSeq (protein)	NP_789783	NP_997414
Location (UCSC)	Chr 7: 16.86 – 16.88 Mb	Chr 12: 35.98 – 36 Mb
PubMed search
- Wikidata
View/Edit Human	View/Edit Mouse

Anterior gradient protein 3 homolog is a protein that in humans is encoded by the AGR3 gene.
