= QSOX1 =

Protein found in humans

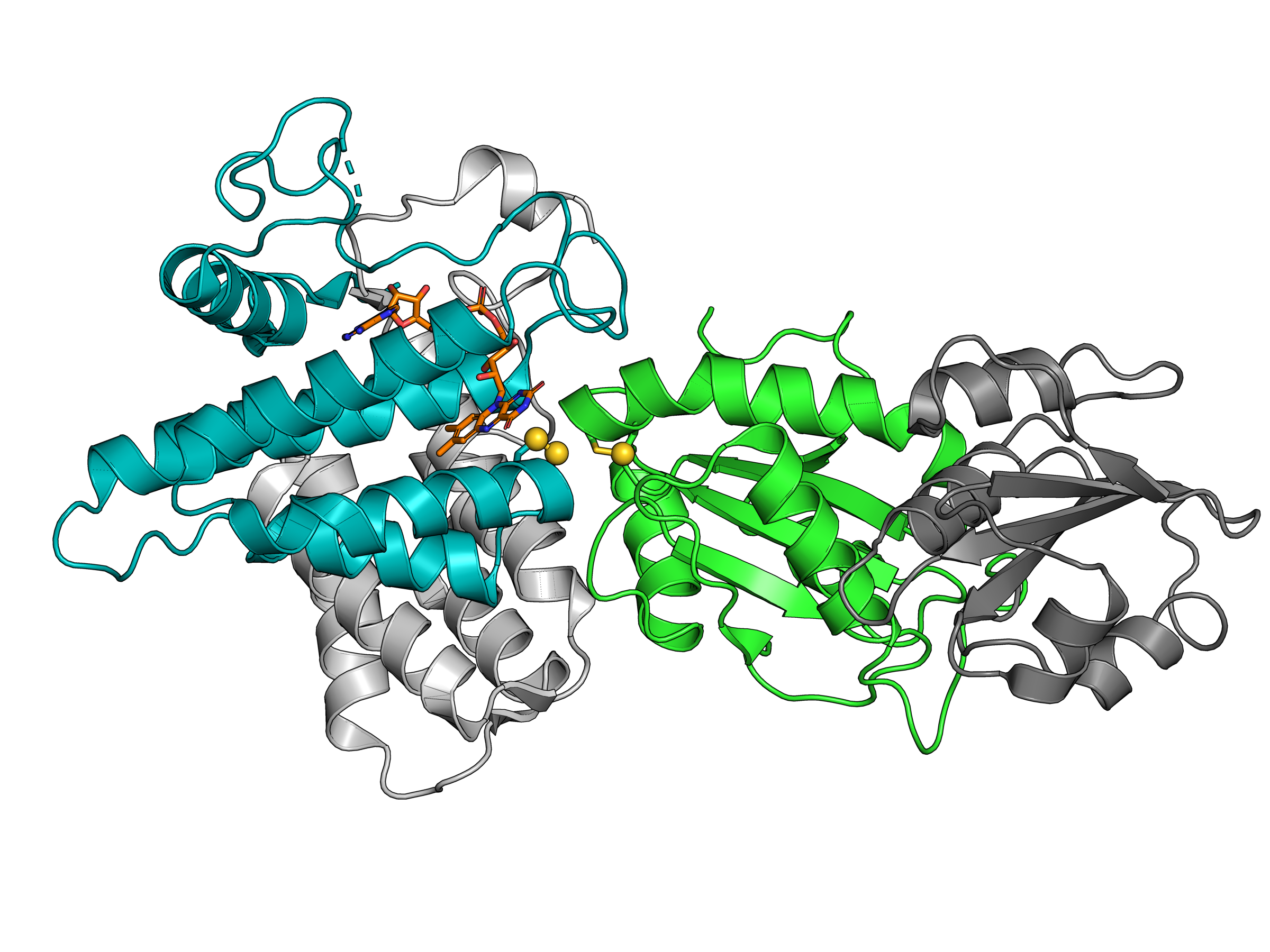

Identifiers
- Aliases: QSOX1, Q6, QSCN6, quiescin sulfhydryl oxidase 1
- External IDs: OMIM: 603120; MGI: 1330818; GeneCards: QSOX1
Available structures
PDB	Ortholog search: PDBe RCSB
PDB	List of PDB id codes 3LLI, 3LLK, 3Q6O, 4IJ3
Enzyme activity
EC #	BRENDA	ExPASy	KEGG	MetaCyc
1.8.3.2	↗	↗	↗	↗

Gene location (Human)
Chr.	Chromosome 1 (human)
Band	1q25.2	Start	180,154,834 bp
Band	1q25.2	End	180,204,030 bp

Gene location (Mouse)
Chr.	Chromosome 1 (mouse)
Band	1|1 G3	Start	155,651,775 bp
Band	1|1 G3	End	155,688,635 bp
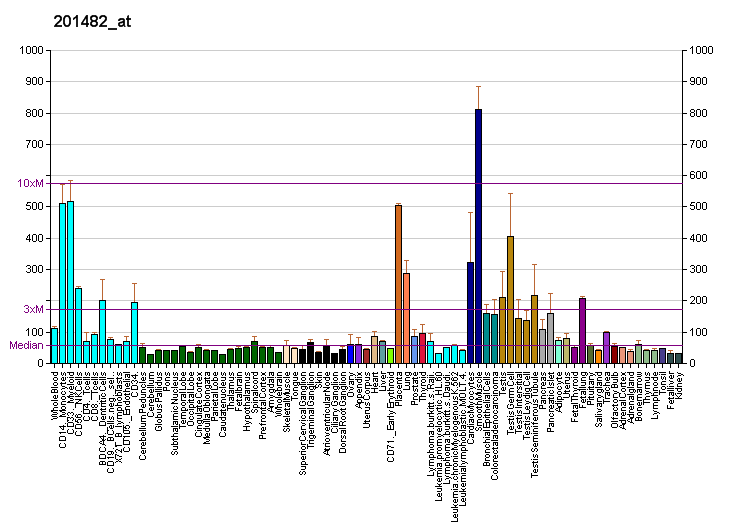
RNA expression pattern
Bgee	Human / Mouse (ortholog); Top expressed in: stromal cell of endometrium; gallbladder; right auricle of heart; left testis; right testis; right ovary; upper lobe of left lung; left ovary; right lung; body of stomach / Top expressed in: seminal vesicula; crypt of lieberkuhn of small intestine; lip; gallbladder; esophagus; superior surface of tongue; spermatocyte; granulocyte; ascending aorta; liver; More reference expression data
BioGPS	More reference expression data
Gene ontology
Molecular function	oxidoreductase activity; thiol oxidase activity; protein disulfide isomerase activity; flavin-linked sulfhydryl oxidase activity
Cellular component	integral component of membrane; integral component of Golgi membrane; Golgi membrane; Golgi apparatus; extracellular exosome; intracellular membrane-bounded organelle; membrane; intercellular bridge; extracellular region; platelet alpha granule lumen; extracellular space; specific granule lumen; tertiary granule lumen; endoplasmic reticulum lumen
Biological process	negative regulation of macroautophagy; cell redox homeostasis; platelet degranulation; neutrophil degranulation; post-translational protein modification
Sources:Amigo / QuickGO
Orthologs
Databases	NCBI: entry; OMA: entry
Species	Human	Mouse
Entrez	5768	104009
Ensembl	ENSG00000116260	ENSMUSG00000033684
UniProt	O00391	Q8BND5
RefSeq (mRNA)	NM_002826; NM_001004128	NM_001024945; NM_023268
RefSeq (protein)	NP_001004128; NP_002817	NP_001020116; NP_075757
Location (UCSC)	Chr 1: 180.15 – 180.2 Mb	Chr 1: 155.65 – 155.69 Mb
PubMed search
- Wikidata
View/Edit Human	View/Edit Mouse

Quiescin sulfhydryl oxidase 1 is an enzyme that in humans is encoded by the QSOX1 gene.

This gene encodes an enzyme that is localized primarily to the Golgi apparatus and secreted fluids. QSOX1 is a multi-domain disulfide catalyst. Unlike other disulfide catalysts, QSOX1 can both generate disulfides de novo and catalyze dithiol/disulfide exchange. The de novo disulfide bond formation is catalyzed by the ERV1 domain that contains a FAD co-factor that allows depositions of electrons onto the terminal electron acceptor, typically molecular oxygen. The dithiol/disulfide exchange is catalyzed by the thioredoxin domain. The two domains are linked together by a flexible linker that allows the thioredoxin domain to first interact with the substrate protein and then regenerate by ERV1 domain.

QSOX1 gene expression is induced as fibroblasts begin to exit the proliferative cycle and enter quiescence, suggesting that this gene plays an important role in growth regulation. In fibroblasts QSOX1 is required for normal incorporation of laminin into the extracellular matrix, and thereby for normal cell-cell adhesion and cell migration.

Two transcript variants encoding two different isoforms have been found for this gene. The two isoforms have different tissue distribution and in addition isoform 1 has a transmembrane helix in the carboxy terminal while isoform 2 is a secreted soluble protein.
