= Adenylyl-sulfate reductase (glutathione) =

Enzyme

Identifiers
- EC no.: 1.8.4.9

Databases
- IntEnz: IntEnz view
- BRENDA: BRENDA entry
- ExPASy: NiceZyme view
- KEGG: KEGG entry
- MetaCyc: metabolic pathway
- PRIAM: profile
- PDB structures: RCSB PDB PDBe PDBsum
Search
- PMC: articles
- PubMed: articles
- NCBI: proteins

Adenylyl-sulfate reductase (glutathione) (EC 1.8.4.9) is an enzyme that catalyzes the chemical reaction

AMP + sulfite + glutathione disulfide $\rightleftharpoons$ adenylyl sulfate + 2 glutathione

The 3 substrates of this enzyme are adenosine monophosphate, sulfite, and glutathione disulfide, whereas its two products are adenylyl sulfate and glutathione.

This enzyme belongs to the family of oxidoreductases, specifically those acting on a sulfur group of donors with a disulfide as acceptor. The systematic name of this enzyme class is AMP,sulfite:glutathione-disulfide oxidoreductase (adenosine-5'-phosphosulfate-forming). Other names in common use include 5'-adenylylsulfate reductase (also used for, internal_xref(ec_num(1,8,99,2))), AMP,sulfite:oxidized-glutathione oxidoreductase, (adenosine-5'-phosphosulfate-forming), and plant-type 5'-adenylylsulfate reductase. In plants, APS is reduced by the plastidic enzyme APS reductase (APR; EC 1.8.4.9) in the presence of physiological concentrations of reduced glutathione (GSH), which acts as an electron donor.
