= Protein-disulfide reductase =

protein-disulfide reductase

Identifiers
- EC no.: 1.8.1.8
- CAS no.: 9029-19-0

Databases
- IntEnz: IntEnz view
- BRENDA: BRENDA entry
- ExPASy: NiceZyme view
- KEGG: KEGG entry
- MetaCyc: metabolic pathway
- PRIAM: profile
- PDB structures: RCSB PDB PDBe PDBsum
- Gene Ontology: AmiGO / QuickGO
Search
- PMC: articles
- PubMed: articles
- NCBI: proteins

In enzymology, a protein-disulfide reductase (EC 1.8.1.8) is an enzyme that catalyzes the chemical reaction

protein dithiol + NAD(P)+ $\rightleftharpoons$ protein disulfide + NAD(P)H + H^{+}

Humans have an enzyme of this type which is coded by the gene NXN (nucleoredoxin), and is involved in the regulation of the Wnt signaling pathway.

The 3 substrates of this enzyme are protein dithiol, NAD^{+}, and NADP^{+}, whereas its 4 products are protein disulfide, NADH, NADPH, and H^{+}.

This enzyme belongs to the family of oxidoreductases, specifically those acting on a sulfur group of donors with NAD+ or NADP+ as acceptor. The systematic name of this enzyme class is protein-dithiol:NAD(P)+ oxidoreductase. Other names in common use include protein disulphide reductase, insulin-glutathione transhydrogenase, disulfide reductase, and NAD(P)H2:protein-disulfide oxidoreductase.

== Structural studies ==
As of late 2007, 8 structures have been solved for this class of enzymes, with PDB accession codes 1UC7, 1VRS, 1Z5Y, 2FWE, 2FWF, 2FWG, 2FWH, and 2PPT.
