= NME8 =

Protein-coding gene in the species Homo sapiens

Identifiers
- Aliases: NME8, CILD6, NM23-H8, SPTRX2, TXNDC3, sptrx-2, HEL-S-99, NME/NM23 family member 8, DNAI8
- External IDs: OMIM: 607421; MGI: 1920662; GeneCards: NME8

Gene location (Human)
Chr.	Chromosome 7 (human)
Band	7p14.1	Start	37,848,597 bp
Band	7p14.1	End	37,900,397 bp

Gene location (Mouse)
Chr.	Chromosome 13 (mouse)
Band	13 A2|13 7.0 cM	Start	19,829,248 bp
Band	13 A2|13 7.0 cM	End	19,881,964 bp
RNA expression pattern
Bgee	Human / Mouse (ortholog); Top expressed in: granulocyte; testicle; gonad; monocyte; right testis; left testis; sperm; blood; bone marrow; bone marrow cell / Top expressed in: spermatid; seminiferous tubule; spermatocyte; embryo; Gonadal ridge; bone marrow; fossa; ventricle of the heart; islet of Langerhans; lens; More reference expression data
BioGPS	n/a
Gene ontology
Molecular function	microtubule binding; nucleoside diphosphate kinase activity
Cellular component	cytoplasm; sperm principal piece; sperm cytoplasmic droplet; outer dynein arm
Biological process	multicellular organism development; flagellated sperm motility; cellular response to reactive oxygen species; cell differentiation; nucleoside diphosphate phosphorylation; spermatogenesis; cell redox homeostasis; cilium assembly
Sources:Amigo / QuickGO
Orthologs
Databases	NCBI: entry; OMA: entry
Species	Human	Mouse
Entrez	51314	73412
Ensembl	ENSG00000086288	ENSMUSG00000041138
UniProt	Q8N427	Q715T0
RefSeq (mRNA)	NM_016616	NM_001167909; NM_181591
RefSeq (protein)	NP_057700	NP_001161381; NP_853622
Location (UCSC)	Chr 7: 37.85 – 37.9 Mb	Chr 13: 19.83 – 19.88 Mb
PubMed search
- Wikidata
View/Edit Human	View/Edit Mouse

Thioredoxin domain-containing protein 3 (TXNDC3), also known as spermatid-specific thioredoxin-2 (Sptrx-2), is a protein that in humans is encoded by the NME8 gene (also known as the TXNDC3 gene) on chromosome 7.

== Function ==
This gene encodes a protein with an N-terminal thioredoxin domain and three C-terminal nucleoside diphosphate kinase (NDK) domains, but the NDK domains are thought to be catalytically inactive. The sea urchin ortholog of this gene encodes a component of sperm outer dynein arms, and the protein is implicated in ciliary function.

== Clinical significance ==
Mutations in the TXNDC3 gene are associated with primary ciliary dyskinesia.
