= PDIA2 =

Protein-coding gene in the species Homo sapiens

Identifiers
- Aliases: PDIA2, PDA2, PDI, PDIP, PDIR, protein disulfide isomerase family A member 2
- External IDs: OMIM: 608012; MGI: 1916441; GeneCards: PDIA2
Enzyme activity
EC #	BRENDA	ExPASy	KEGG	MetaCyc
5.3.4.1	↗	↗	↗	↗

Gene location (Human)
Chr.	Chromosome 16 (human)
Band	16p13.3	Start	283,164 bp
Band	16p13.3	End	287,215 bp

Gene location (Mouse)
Chr.	Chromosome 17 (mouse)
Band	17|17 A3.3	Start	26,414,973 bp
Band	17|17 A3.3	End	26,418,061 bp
RNA expression pattern
Bgee	Human / Mouse (ortholog); Top expressed in: body of pancreas; right hemisphere of cerebellum; right frontal lobe; C1 segment; anterior cingulate cortex; paraflocculus of cerebellum; Brodmann area 9; testicle; body of stomach; amygdala / Top expressed in: epithelium of stomach; islet of Langerhans; duodenum; embryo; embryo; morula; human fetus; sexually immature organism; bone marrow; blastocyst; More reference expression data
BioGPS	n/a
Gene ontology
Molecular function	disulfide oxidoreductase activity; steroid binding; protein binding; peptidyl-proline 4-dioxygenase activity; isomerase activity; lipid binding; protein disulfide isomerase activity
Cellular component	endoplasmic reticulum lumen; endoplasmic reticulum
Biological process	protein retention in ER lumen; protein folding in endoplasmic reticulum; protein folding; regulation of oxidative stress-induced intrinsic apoptotic signaling pathway; cell redox homeostasis; response to endoplasmic reticulum stress; peptidyl-proline hydroxylation
Sources:Amigo / QuickGO
Orthologs
Databases	NCBI: entry; OMA: entry
Species	Human	Mouse
Entrez	64714	69191
Ensembl	ENSG00000185615	ENSMUSG00000024184
UniProt	Q13087	D3Z6P0
RefSeq (mRNA)	NM_006849	NM_001081070
RefSeq (protein)	NP_006840	NP_001074539
Location (UCSC)	Chr 16: 0.28 – 0.29 Mb	Chr 17: 26.41 – 26.42 Mb
PubMed search
- Wikidata
View/Edit Human	View/Edit Mouse

Protein disulfide isomerase family A member 2 is a protein that in humans is encoded by the PDIA2 gene.

== Function ==
This gene encodes a member of the disulfide isomerase (PDI) family of endoplasmic reticulum (ER) proteins that catalyze protein folding and thiol-disulfide interchange reactions. The encoded protein has an N-terminal ER-signal sequence, two catalytically active thioredoxin (TRX) domains, two TRX-like domains and a C-terminal ER-retention sequence. The protein plays a role in the folding of nascent proteins in the endoplasmic reticulum by forming disulfide bonds through its thiol isomerase, oxidase, and reductase activity. The encoded protein also possesses estradiol-binding activity and can modulate intracellular estradiol levels. [provided by RefSeq, Sep 2017].
