= PRKCQ =

Protein-coding gene in the species Homo sapiens

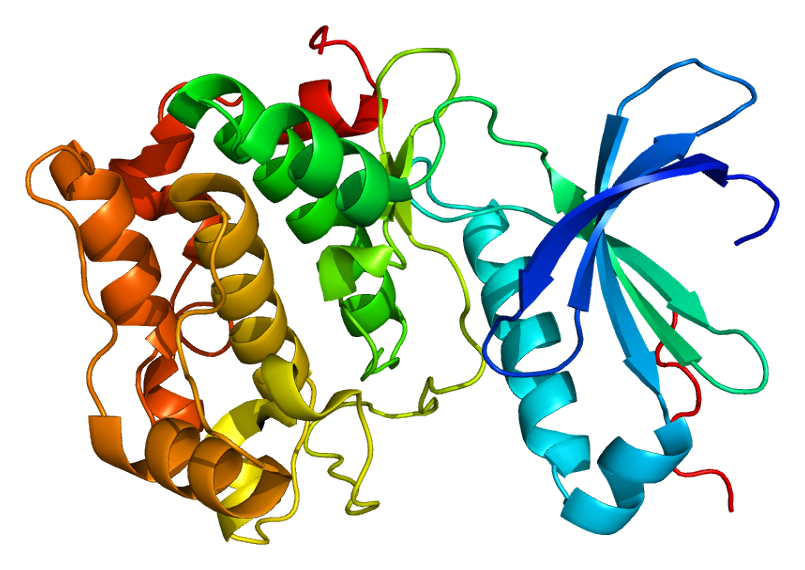

Identifiers
- Aliases: PRKCQ, PRKCT, nPKC-theta, protein kinase C theta
- External IDs: OMIM: 600448; MGI: 97601; GeneCards: PRKCQ
Available structures
PDB	Ortholog search: PDBe RCSB
PDB	List of PDB id codes 1XJD, 2ENJ, 2ENN, 2ENZ, 2JED, 4Q9Z, 4RA5, 5F9E
Enzyme activity
EC #	BRENDA	ExPASy	KEGG	MetaCyc
2.7.11.13	↗	↗	↗	↗

Gene location (Human)
Chr.	Chromosome 10 (human)
Band	10p15.1	Start	6,427,143 bp
Band	10p15.1	End	6,580,301 bp

Gene location (Mouse)
Chr.	Chromosome 2 (mouse)
Band	2 A1|2 8.42 cM	Start	11,176,919 bp
Band	2 A1|2 8.42 cM	End	11,306,033 bp
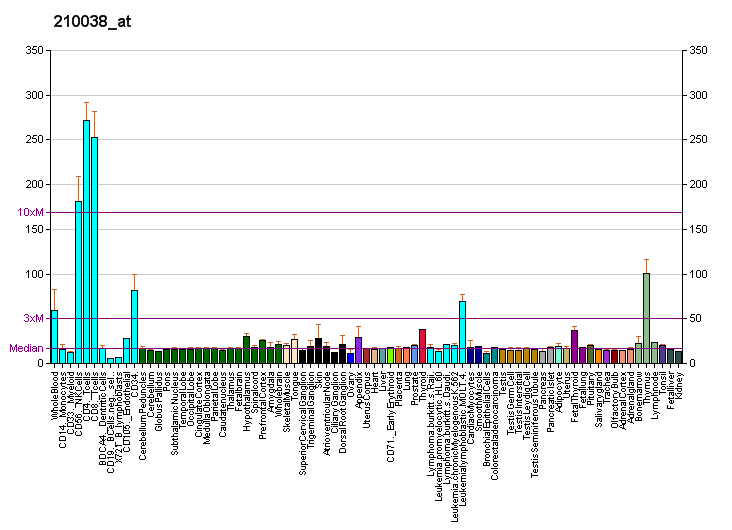

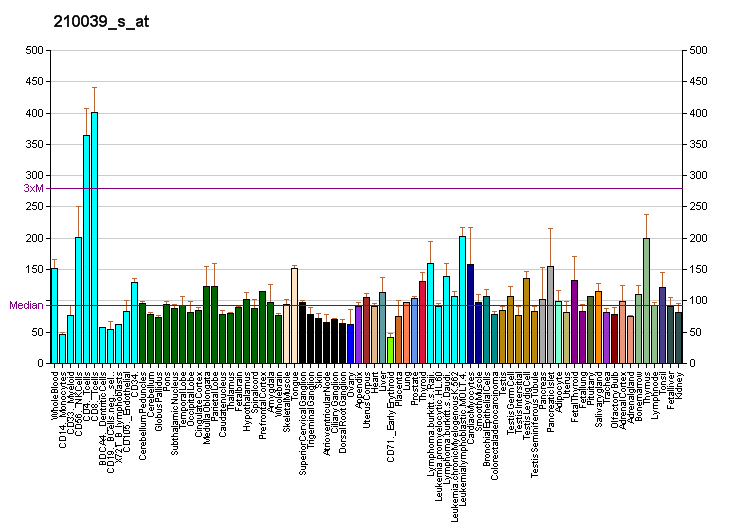
RNA expression pattern
Bgee	Human / Mouse (ortholog); Top expressed in: triceps brachii muscle; glutes; biceps brachii; vastus lateralis muscle; Skeletal muscle tissue of biceps brachii; Skeletal muscle tissue of rectus abdominis; thoracic diaphragm; deltoid muscle; muscle of thigh; tibialis anterior muscle / Top expressed in: habenula; ankle; temporal muscle; retinal pigment epithelium; sternocleidomastoid muscle; digastric muscle; Epithelium of choroid plexus; muscle of thigh; seminiferous tubule; choroid plexus of fourth ventricle; More reference expression data
BioGPS	More reference expression data
Gene ontology
Molecular function	transferase activity; nucleotide binding; protein kinase C activity; metal ion binding; kinase activity; protein binding; ATP binding; protein serine/threonine kinase activity; protein kinase activity
Cellular component	cytoplasm; cytosol; membrane; plasma membrane; intracellular anatomical structure; immunological synapse; microtubule organizing center; aggresome
Biological process	intracellular signal transduction; regulation of transcription, DNA-templated; positive regulation of telomere capping; phosphorylation; immune system process; positive regulation of telomere maintenance via telomerase; positive regulation of T-helper 2 cell activation; positive regulation of interleukin-4 production; axon guidance; platelet activation; Fc-epsilon receptor signaling pathway; protein phosphorylation; negative regulation of T cell apoptotic process; negative regulation of insulin receptor signaling pathway; positive regulation of T cell activation; membrane protein ectodomain proteolysis; positive regulation of NF-kappaB transcription factor activity; peptidyl-serine phosphorylation; positive regulation of T-helper 17 type immune response; regulation of cell growth; positive regulation of T cell proliferation; positive regulation of telomerase activity; cell chemotaxis; positive regulation of interleukin-17 production; inflammatory response; T cell receptor signaling pathway; regulation of platelet aggregation; regulation of megakaryocyte differentiation
Sources:Amigo / QuickGO
Orthologs
Databases	NCBI: entry; OMA: entry
Species	Human	Mouse
Entrez	5588	18761
Ensembl	ENSG00000065675	ENSMUSG00000026778
UniProt	Q04759	Q02111
RefSeq (mRNA)	NM_001242413; NM_001282644; NM_001282645; NM_006257; NM_001323265 NM_001323266; NM_001323267	NM_008859; NM_178075
RefSeq (protein)	NP_001229342; NP_001269573; NP_001269574; NP_001310194; NP_001310195 NP_001310196; NP_006248	NP_032885
Location (UCSC)	Chr 10: 6.43 – 6.58 Mb	Chr 2: 11.18 – 11.31 Mb
PubMed search
- Wikidata
View/Edit Human	View/Edit Mouse

Protein kinase C theta (PKC-θ) is an enzyme that in humans is encoded by the PRKCQ gene. PKC-θ, a member of serine/threonine kinases, is mainly expressed in hematopoietic cells with high levels in platelets and T lymphocytes, where plays a role in signal transduction. Different subpopulations of T cells vary in their requirements of PKC-θ, therefore PKC-θ is considered as a potential target for inhibitors in the context of immunotherapy.

== Function ==
Protein kinase C (PKC) is a family of serine- and threonine-specific protein kinases that can be activated by the second messenger diacylglycerol. PKC family members phosphorylate a wide variety of protein targets and are known to be involved in diverse cellular signaling pathways. PKC family members also serve as major receptors for phorbol esters, a class of tumor promoters. Each member of the PKC family has a specific expression profile and is believed to play a distinct role. The protein encoded by this gene is one of the PKC family members. It is a calcium-independent and phospholipid-dependent protein kinase. This kinase is important for T-cell activation. It is required for the activation of the transcription factors NF-kappaB and AP-1, and may link the T cell receptor (TCR) signaling complex to the activation of the transcription factors. PKC-θ also play a role in the apoptosis of lymphoid cells where it negatively influence and delay the aggregation of spectrin in an early phase of apoptosis.

=== The role of PKC-θ in T cells ===
PKC-θ has a role in the transduction of signals in T cells, the kinase influences their activation, survival and growth. PKC-θ is important in the signal pathway integrating signals from TCR and CD28 receptors. A junction between an APC (an antigen presenting cell) and a T cell through their TCR and MHC receptors forms an immunological synapse. The active PKC-θ is localized in immunological synapse of T cells between the cSMAC (central supramolecular activation cluster containing TCR) and pSMAC (peripheral supramolecular activation cluster containing LFA-1 and ICAM-1). In regulatory T cells, PKC-θ is depleted from the region of immunological synapse, whereas in effector T cells, PKC-θ is present. As a result of co-stimulation by CD28 and TCR, PKC-θ is sumoylated by SUMO1 predominantly on the sites Lys325 and Lys506. Sumoylation is important because of forming of the immunological synapse. Subsequently, PKC-θ phosphorylates SPAK (STE20/SPS1-related, proline alanine-rich kinase) that activates the transcription factor AP-1 (activating protein-1). PKC-θ also initiates the assembly of proteins Carma-1, Bcl-10 and Malt-1 by phosphorylation of Carma-1. This complex of three proteins activates the transcription factor NF-κB (nuclear factor-κB). Furthermore, PKC-θ plays a role in the activation of transcription factor NF-AT (nuclear factor of activated T cells). Thus, PKC-θ promotes inflammation in effector T cells. PKC-θ plays a role in the activation of ILC2 and contribute to the proliferation of Th2 cells. The kinase PKC-θ is crucial for function of Th2 and Th17. Moreover, PKC-θ can translocate itself to the nucleus and by phosphorylation of histones increases the accessibility of transcriptional-memory-responsive genes in memory T cells. PKC-θ plays a role in anti-tumor activity of NK cells. It was observed that in mice without PKC-θ, MHCI-deficient tumors are more often.

=== The possible application of its inhibitors ===
Properties of PKC-θ make PKC-θ a good target for therapy in order to reduce harmful inflammation mediated by Th17 (mediating autoimmune diseases) or by Th2 (causing allergies) without diminishing the ability of T cells to get rid of viral-infected cells. Inhibitors could be used in T-cell mediated adaptive immune responses. Inhibition of PKC-θ downregulates transcription factors (NF-κB, NF-AT) and cause lower production of IL-2. It was observed that animals without PKC-θ are resistant to some autoimmune diseases. PKC-θ could be a target of inhibitors in the therapy of allergies.

The problem is that inhibitors of PKC-θ targeting catalytic sites may have toxic effects because of low specificity (catalytic sites among PKCs are very similar). Allosteric inhibitors have to be more specific to concrete isoforms of PKC. s.

== Interactions ==
PRKCQ has been shown to interact with:

- AKT1
- FYN,
- GLRX3, and
- VAV1.

PRKCQ has been shown to phosphorylate CARD11 as part of the NF-κB signaling pathway.

== Inhibitors ==
- (R)-2-((S)-4-(3-Chloro-5-fluoro-6-(1H-pyrazolo[3,4-b]pyridin- 3-yl)pyridin-2-yl)piperazin-2-yl)-3-methylbutan-2-ol

== See also ==
- Protein kinase C
