= TXNDC5 =

Protein-coding gene in the species Homo sapiens

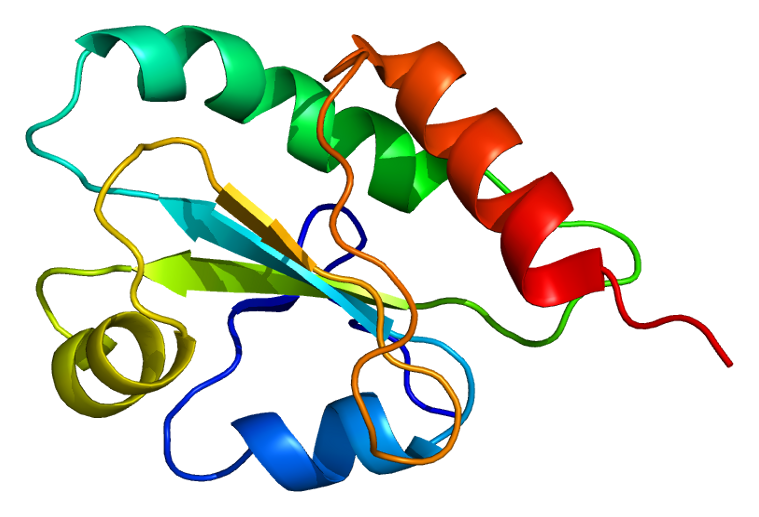

Identifiers
- Aliases: TXNDC5, ENDOPDI, ERP46, HCC-2, PDIA15, STRF8, UNQ364, HCC2, thioredoxin domain containing 5
- External IDs: OMIM: 616412; MGI: 2145316; GeneCards: TXNDC5
Available structures
PDB	Ortholog search: PDBe RCSB
PDB	List of PDB id codes 2DIZ, 3UJ1, 3UVT, 3WGD, 3WGE, 3WGX
Enzyme activity
EC #	BRENDA	ExPASy	KEGG	MetaCyc
5.3.4.1	↗	↗	↗	↗

Gene location (Human)
Chr.	Chromosome 6 (human)
Band	6p24.3	Start	7,881,517 bp
Band	6p24.3	End	7,910,788 bp

Gene location (Mouse)
Chr.	Chromosome 13 (mouse)
Band	13|13 A3.3	Start	38,684,055 bp
Band	13|13 A3.3	End	38,712,800 bp
RNA expression pattern
Bgee	Human / Mouse (ortholog); Top expressed in: duodenum; rectum; stromal cell of endometrium; appendix; lymph node; spleen; smooth muscle tissue; placenta; islet of Langerhans; body of pancreas / Top expressed in: lacrimal gland; calvaria; salivary gland; pyloric antrum; molar; parotid gland; external carotid artery; submandibular gland; crypt of lieberkuhn of small intestine; seminal vesicula; More reference expression data
BioGPS	n/a
Gene ontology
Molecular function	protein binding; isomerase activity; protein disulfide isomerase activity
Cellular component	lysosomal lumen; endoplasmic reticulum lumen; extracellular exosome; endoplasmic reticulum; extracellular region; azurophil granule lumen
Biological process	apoptotic cell clearance; negative regulation of apoptotic process; protein folding; cell redox homeostasis; response to endoplasmic reticulum stress; neutrophil degranulation
Sources:Amigo / QuickGO
Orthologs
Databases	NCBI: entry; OMA: entry
Species	Human	Mouse
Entrez	81567	105245
Ensembl	ENSG00000239264	ENSMUSG00000038991
UniProt	Q8NBS9	Q91W90
RefSeq (mRNA)	NM_030810; NM_001145549; NM_022085	NM_001289598; NM_001289599; NM_145367
RefSeq (protein)	NP_001139021; NP_110437	NP_001276527; NP_001276528; NP_663342
Location (UCSC)	Chr 6: 7.88 – 7.91 Mb	Chr 13: 38.68 – 38.71 Mb
PubMed search
- Wikidata
View/Edit Human	View/Edit Mouse

Thioredoxin domain-containing protein 5 is a protein that in humans is encoded by the TXNDC5 gene.

== Function ==
This gene encodes a protein disulfide-isomerase. Its expression is induced by hypoxia and its role may be to protect hypoxic cells from apoptosis. This gene can be co-transcribed with the upstream gene MUTED.
