= P4HB =

Protein-coding gene in the species Homo sapiens

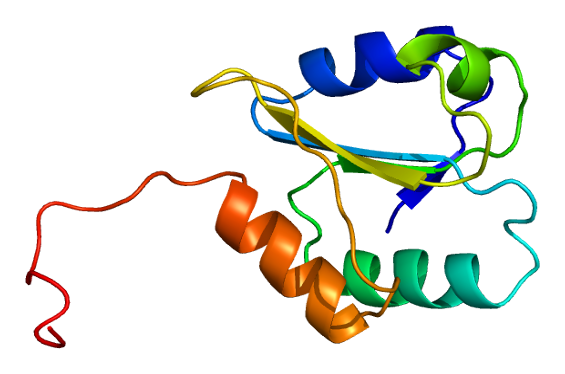

Identifiers
- Aliases: P4HB, DSI, ERBA2L, GIT, P4Hbeta, PDI, PDIA1, PHDB, PO4DB, PO4HB, PROHB, CLCRP1, prolyl 4-hydroxylase subunit beta
- External IDs: OMIM: 176790; MGI: 97464; GeneCards: P4HB
Available structures
PDB	Ortholog search: PDBe RCSB
PDB	List of PDB id codes 1X5C, 1BJX, 2K18, 4JU5, 4EL1, 3BJ5, 1MEK, 2BJX, 3UEM, 4EKZ
Enzyme activity
EC #	BRENDA	ExPASy	KEGG	MetaCyc
5.3.4.1	↗	↗	↗	↗

Gene location (Human)
Chr.	Chromosome 17 (human)
Band	17q25.3	Start	81,843,159 bp
Band	17q25.3	End	81,860,856 bp

Gene location (Mouse)
Chr.	Chromosome 11 (mouse)
Band	11 E2|11 84.27 cM	Start	120,451,124 bp
Band	11 E2|11 84.27 cM	End	120,464,079 bp
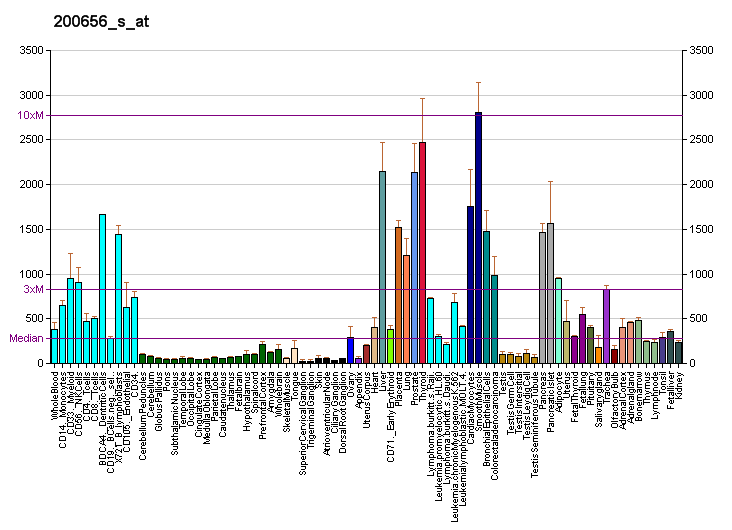

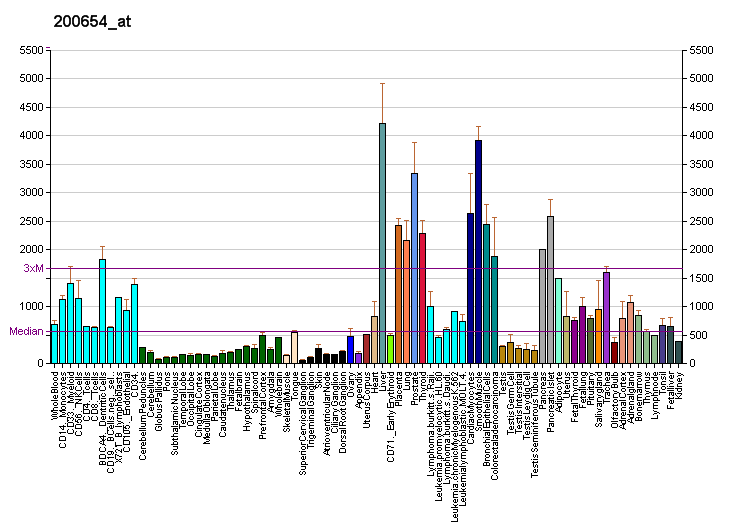
RNA expression pattern
Bgee	Human / Mouse (ortholog); Top expressed in: stromal cell of endometrium; parotid gland; body of pancreas; jejunal mucosa; mucosa of ileum; islet of Langerhans; right lobe of liver; duodenum; anterior pituitary; beta cell / Top expressed in: lacrimal gland; gastrula; crypt of lieberkuhn of small intestine; molar; parotid gland; Paneth cell; calvaria; renal corpuscle; submandibular gland; pyloric antrum; More reference expression data
BioGPS	More reference expression data
Gene ontology
Molecular function	isomerase activity; integrin binding; protein binding; procollagen-proline 4-dioxygenase activity; protein heterodimerization activity; enzyme binding; RNA binding; protein disulfide isomerase activity
Cellular component	procollagen-proline 4-dioxygenase complex; endoplasmic reticulum lumen; membrane; focal adhesion; melanosome; plasma membrane; endoplasmic reticulum chaperone complex; extracellular region; endoplasmic reticulum; extracellular exosome; external side of plasma membrane; endoplasmic reticulum-Golgi intermediate compartment; extracellular matrix
Biological process	positive regulation of viral entry into host cell; peptidyl-proline hydroxylation to 4-hydroxy-L-proline; regulation of oxidative stress-induced intrinsic apoptotic signaling pathway; cell redox homeostasis; response to endoplasmic reticulum stress; cellular response to hypoxia; protein folding; chylomicron assembly; very-low-density lipoprotein particle assembly; cellular response to oxidative stress; post-translational protein modification; interleukin-12-mediated signaling pathway; interleukin-23-mediated signaling pathway; cellular response to interleukin-7
Sources:Amigo / QuickGO
Orthologs
Databases	NCBI: entry; OMA: entry
Species	Human	Mouse
Entrez	5034	18453
Ensembl	ENSG00000185624	ENSMUSG00000025130
UniProt	P07237	P09103
RefSeq (mRNA)	NM_000918	NM_011032
RefSeq (protein)	NP_000909	NP_035162
Location (UCSC)	Chr 17: 81.84 – 81.86 Mb	Chr 11: 120.45 – 120.46 Mb
PubMed search
- Wikidata
View/Edit Human	View/Edit Mouse

Protein disulfide-isomerase, also known as the beta-subunit of prolyl 4-hydroxylase (P4HB), is an enzyme that in humans encoded by the P4HB gene. The human P4HB gene is localized in chromosome 17q25. Unlike other prolyl 4-hydroxylase family proteins, this protein is multifunctional and acts as an oxidoreductase for disulfide formation, breakage, and isomerization. The activity of P4HB is tightly regulated. Both dimer dissociation and substrate binding are likely to enhance its enzymatic activity during the catalysis process.

== Structure ==
P4HB has four thioredoxin domains (a, b, b’, and a’), with two CGHC active sites in the a and a’ domains. In both the reduced and oxidized state, these domains are arranged as a horseshoe shape. In reduced P4HB, domains a, b, and b' are in the same plane, while domain a' twists out at a ~45° angle. When oxidized, the four domains stay in the same plane, and the distance between the active sites is larger than that in the reduced state. The oxidized form also exposes more hydrophobic areas and possesses a larger cleft to facilitate substrate binding. P4HB has been shown to dimerize in vivo via noncatalytic bb' domains. Formation of dimer blocks substrate-binding site and inhibits P4HB's activity.

== Function ==
This gene encodes the beta subunit of prolyl 4-hydroxylase, a highly abundant multifunctional enzyme that belongs to the protein disulfide isomerase family. When present as a tetramer consisting of two alpha and two beta subunits, this enzyme is involved in hydroxylation of prolyl residues in preprocollagen. This enzyme is also a disulfide isomerase containing two thioredoxin domains that catalyze the formation, breakage and rearrangement of disulfide bonds. Other known functions include its ability to act as a chaperone that inhibits aggregation of misfolded proteins in a concentration-dependent manner, its ability to bind thyroid hormone, its role in both the influx and efflux of S-nitrosothiol-bound nitric oxide, and its function as a subunit of the microsomal triglyceride transfer protein complex.

== Clinical significance ==
P4HB can be nitrosylated, and elevation of nitrosylated P4HB has been shown in Parkinson's and Alzheimer's disease brain tissue, as well as in transgenic mutant superoxide dismutase 1 mouse and human sporadic amyotrophic lateral sclerosis spinal cord tissues. In addition to neurodegenerative diseases, P4HB level is upregulated in glioblastoma multiforme (GBM) (brain tumor). Inhibition of P4HB attenuates resistance to temozolomide, a standard GBM chemotherapeutic agent, via the PERK arm of endoplasmic reticulum stress response pathway. Furthermore, heterozygous missense mutation in P4HB can cause Cole-Carpenter syndrome, a severe bone fragility disorder.

== Interactions ==
P4HB has been shown to interact with UBQLN1, ERO1LB and ERO1L.
