= TXNL1 =

Protein-coding gene in the species Homo sapiens

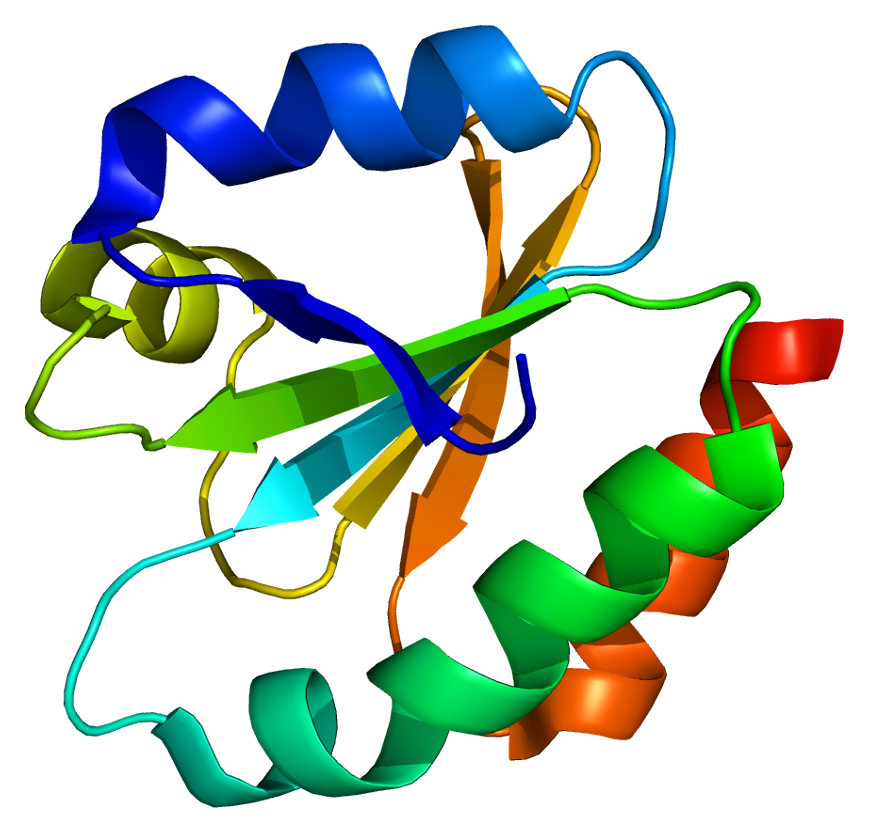
Available structures
| PDB | Ortholog search: PDBe RCSB |
| PDB | List of PDB id codes 1GH2, 1WWY |

Identifiers
- Aliases: TXNL1, HEL-S-114, TRP32, TXL-1, TXNL, Txl, thioredoxin like 1
- External IDs: OMIM: 603049; MGI: 1860078; HomoloGene: 3515; GeneCards: TXNL1; OMA:TXNL1 - orthologs

Gene location (Human)
| Chr. | Chromosome 18 (human) |
| Band | 18q21.31 | Start | 56,597,209 bp |
| Band | 18q21.31 | End | 56,651,600 bp |

Gene location (Mouse)
| Chr. | Chromosome 18 (mouse) |
| Band | 18|18 E1 | Start | 63,794,165 bp |
| Band | 18|18 E1 | End | 63,841,872 bp |
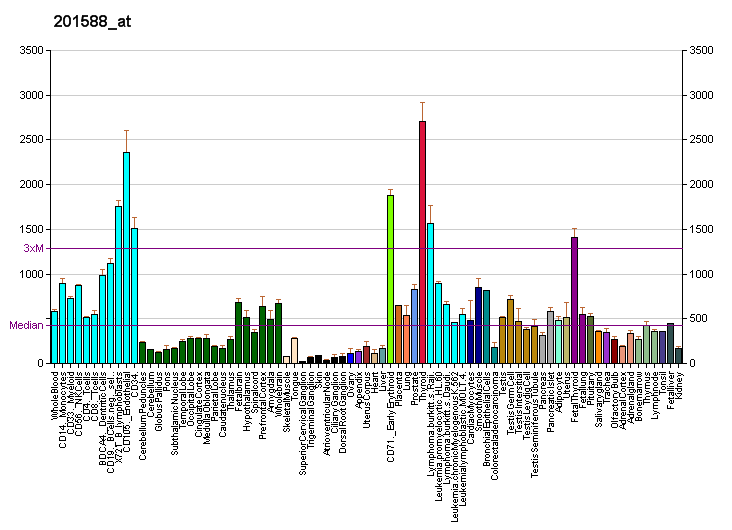
RNA expression pattern
| Bgee | Human / Mouse (ortholog); Top expressed in: parotid gland; endothelial cell; hair follicle; oral cavity; right ventricle; trabecular bone; biceps brachii; retinal pigment epithelium; Epithelium of choroid plexus; middle temporal gyrus / Top expressed in: endocardial cushion; atrioventricular valve; Paneth cell; fossa; condyle; abdominal wall; facial motor nucleus; lacrimal gland; dermis; vas deferens; More reference expression data |
| BioGPS | More reference expression data |
Gene ontology
| Molecular function | disulfide oxidoreductase activity; oxidoreductase activity, acting on a sulfur group of donors, disulfide as acceptor; thioredoxin-disulfide reductase activity; protein-disulfide reductase activity; protein-disulfide reductase (NAD(P)) activity |
| Cellular component | cytoplasm; proteasome complex; nucleus; cytosol |
| Biological process | cellular response to oxidative stress; cell redox homeostasis; cellular oxidant detoxification |
Sources:Amigo / QuickGO
Orthologs
| Species | Human | Mouse |
| Entrez | 9352 | 53382 |
| Ensembl | ENSG00000091164 | ENSMUSG00000024583 |
| UniProt | O43396 | Q8CDN6 |
| RefSeq (mRNA) | NM_004786 | NM_016792 |
| RefSeq (protein) | NP_004777 | NP_058072 |
| Location (UCSC) | Chr 18: 56.6 – 56.65 Mb | Chr 18: 63.79 – 63.84 Mb |
| PubMed search |
- Wikidata
| View/Edit Human | View/Edit Mouse |

Thioredoxin-like protein 1 is a protein that in humans is encoded by the TXNL1 gene.
