= TMX4 =

Protein-coding gene in the species Homo sapiens

Identifiers
- Aliases: TMX4, DJ971N18.2, PDIA14, TXNDC13, thioredoxin related transmembrane protein 4
- External IDs: OMIM: 616766; MGI: 106558; GeneCards: TMX4

Gene location (Human)
Chr.	Chromosome 20 (human)
Band	20p12.3	Start	7,977,346 bp
Band	20p12.3	End	8,019,805 bp

Gene location (Mouse)
Chr.	Chromosome 2 (mouse)
Band	2 F2- F3|2 65.66 cM	Start	134,436,105 bp
Band	2 F2- F3|2 65.66 cM	End	134,486,065 bp
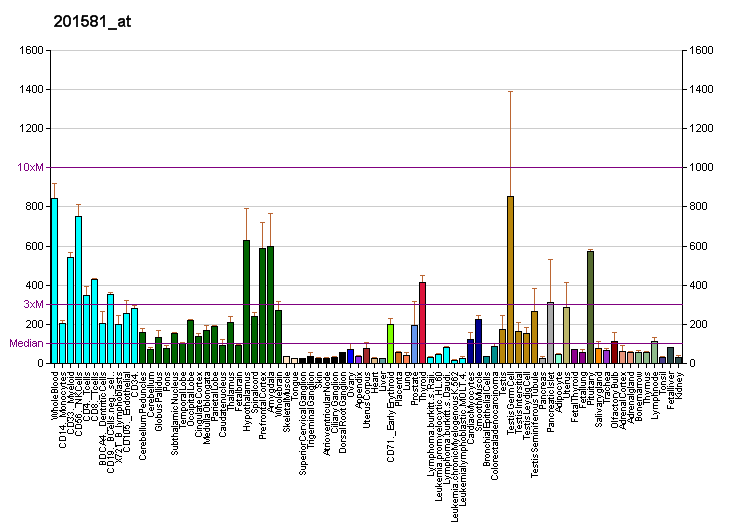

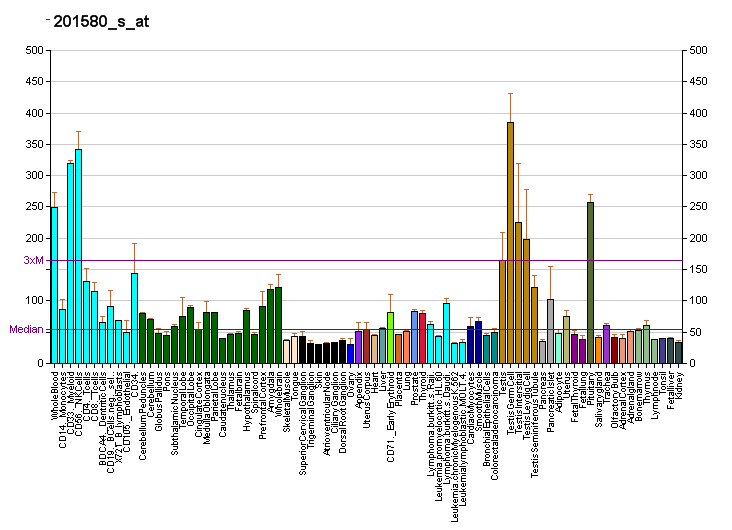
RNA expression pattern
Bgee	Human / Mouse (ortholog); Top expressed in: germinal epithelium; Brodmann area 23; seminal vesicula; tail of epididymis; Epithelium of choroid plexus; caput epididymis; endothelial cell; cardiac muscle tissue of right atrium; parotid gland; middle temporal gyrus / Top expressed in: dorsomedial hypothalamic nucleus; paraventricular nucleus of hypothalamus; arcuate nucleus; ventromedial nucleus; lateral hypothalamus; median eminence; suprachiasmatic nucleus; ventral tegmental area; mammillary body; anterior amygdaloid area; More reference expression data
BioGPS	More reference expression data
Gene ontology
Molecular function	protein disulfide isomerase activity
Cellular component	membrane; integral component of membrane; endoplasmic reticulum
Biological process	protein folding; response to endoplasmic reticulum stress; cell redox homeostasis
Sources:Amigo / QuickGO
Orthologs
Databases	NCBI: entry; OMA: entry
Species	Human	Mouse
Entrez	56255	52837
Ensembl	ENSG00000125827	ENSMUSG00000034723
UniProt	Q9H1E5	Q8C0L0
RefSeq (mRNA)	NM_021156	NM_029148
RefSeq (protein)	NP_066979	NP_083424
Location (UCSC)	Chr 20: 7.98 – 8.02 Mb	Chr 2: 134.44 – 134.49 Mb
PubMed search
- Wikidata
View/Edit Human	View/Edit Mouse

Thioredoxin-related transmembrane protein 4 also known as thioredoxin domain-containing protein 13 is a protein that in humans is encoded by the TMX4 gene.
