= GLRX3 =

Protein-coding gene in the species Homo sapiens

Available structures
PDB	Ortholog search: PDBe RCSB
PDB	List of PDB id codes 2DIY, 2WZ9, 2YAN, 3ZYW

Identifiers
- Aliases: GLRX3, GLRX4, GRX3, GRX4, PICOT, TXNL2, TXNL3, glutaredoxin 3
- External IDs: OMIM: 612754; MGI: 1353653; HomoloGene: 4769; GeneCards: GLRX3; OMA:GLRX3 - orthologs

Gene location (Human)
Chr.	Chromosome 10 (human)
Band	10q26.3	Start	130,136,391 bp
Band	10q26.3	End	130,184,521 bp

Gene location (Mouse)
Chr.	Chromosome 7 (mouse)
Band	7|7 F4	Start	137,039,343 bp
Band	7|7 F4	End	137,070,323 bp
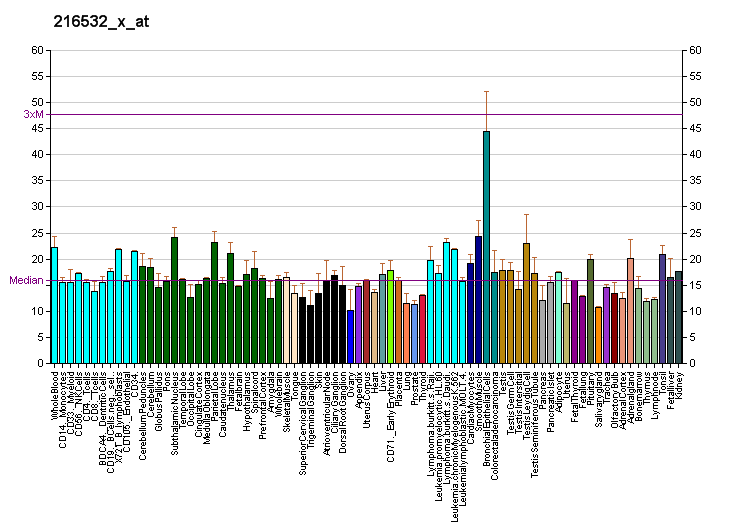

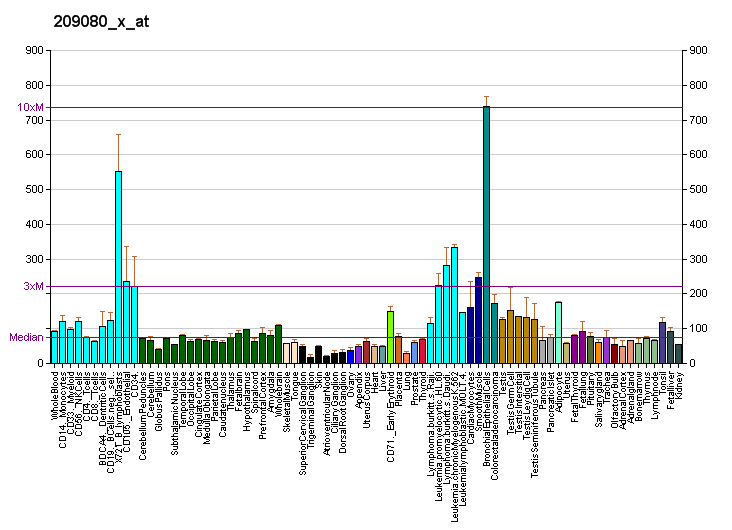

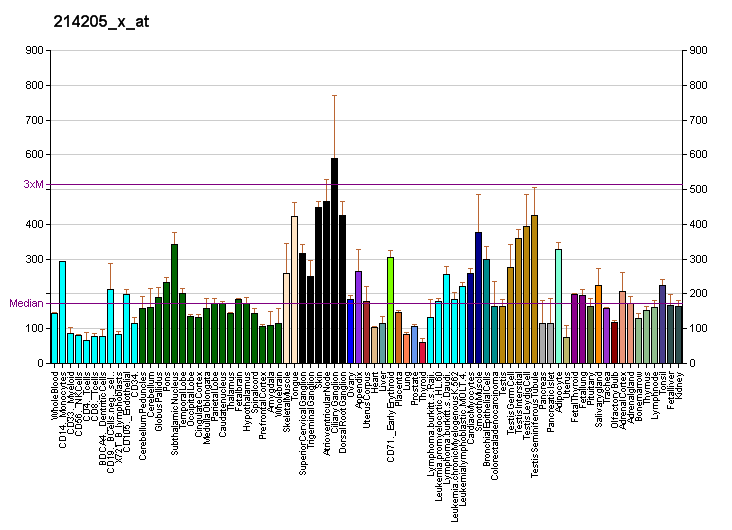
RNA expression pattern
Bgee	Human / Mouse (ortholog); Top expressed in: buccal mucosa cell; islet of Langerhans; right testis; left testis; mucosa of esophagus; right adrenal gland; right adrenal cortex; left adrenal gland; left adrenal cortex; body of pancreas / Top expressed in: spermatid; Ileal epithelium; spermatocyte; choroid plexus of fourth ventricle; lactiferous gland; yolk sac; cardiac muscle tissue of left ventricle; ventricular zone; embryo; genital tubercle; More reference expression data
BioGPS	More reference expression data
Gene ontology
Molecular function	protein-disulfide reductase activity; electron transfer activity; iron-sulfur cluster binding; protein binding; metal ion binding; protein kinase C binding; RNA binding; identical protein binding; glutathione disulfide oxidoreductase activity
Cellular component	cytoplasm; dendrite; cell cortex; Z discdkac; extracellular exosome; nucleus; cytosol
Biological process	cell redox homeostasis; negative regulation of cardiac muscle hypertrophy; regulation of the force of heart contraction; [2Fe-2S cluster assembly]; protein maturation by iron-sulfur cluster transfer; electron transport chain; cellular iron ion homeostasis
Sources:Amigo / QuickGO
Orthologs
Species	Human	Mouse
Entrez	10539	30926
Ensembl	ENSG00000108010	ENSMUSG00000031068
UniProt	O76003	Q9CQM9
RefSeq (mRNA)	NM_001199868; NM_006541; NM_001321980	NM_023140; NM_001348093
RefSeq (protein)	NP_001186797; NP_001308909; NP_006532	NP_075629; NP_001335022
Location (UCSC)	Chr 10: 130.14 – 130.18 Mb	Chr 7: 137.04 – 137.07 Mb
PubMed search
- Wikidata
View/Edit Human	View/Edit Mouse

Glutaredoxin-3 is a protein that in humans is encoded by the GLRX3 gene.

== Interactions ==
GLRX3 has been shown to interact with PRKCQ.
