= TXNDC2 =

Protein-coding gene in the species Homo sapiens

Identifiers
- Aliases: TXNDC2, SPTRX, SPTRX1, thioredoxin domain containing 2
- External IDs: OMIM: 617790; MGI: 2389312; GeneCards: TXNDC2

Gene location (Human)
Chr.	Chromosome 18 (human)
Band	18p11.22	Start	9,885,766 bp
Band	18p11.22	End	9,889,275 bp

Gene location (Mouse)
Chr.	Chromosome 17 (mouse)
Band	17|17 E1.1	Start	65,944,502 bp
Band	17|17 E1.1	End	65,949,163 bp
RNA expression pattern
Bgee	Human / Mouse (ortholog); Top expressed in: left testis; right testis; sperm; testicle; gonad; brain stem; muscle tissue; medulla oblongata; stromal cell of endometrium; upper respiratory tract / Top expressed in: seminiferous tubule; zygote; primary oocyte; secondary oocyte; spermatid; paraventricular nucleus of hypothalamus; spermatocyte; adrenal gland; embryo; ovary; More reference expression data
BioGPS	n/a
Gene ontology
Molecular function	protein-disulfide reductase activity; thioredoxin-disulfide reductase activity; oxidoreductase activity, acting on a sulfur group of donors, disulfide as acceptor; protein-disulfide reductase (NAD(P)) activity
Cellular component	cytoplasm
Biological process	multicellular organism development; cellular response to oxidative stress; cell differentiation; glycerol ether metabolic process; cell redox homeostasis; spermatogenesis; cellular oxidant detoxification
Sources:Amigo / QuickGO
Orthologs
Databases	NCBI: entry; OMA: entry
Species	Human	Mouse
Entrez	84203	213272
Ensembl	ENSG00000168454	ENSMUSG00000050612
UniProt	Q86VQ3	Q6P902
RefSeq (mRNA)	NM_032243; NM_001098529	NM_001146002; NM_153519
RefSeq (protein)	NP_001091999; NP_115619	NP_001139474; NP_705739; NP_001391021; NP_001391027
Location (UCSC)	Chr 18: 9.89 – 9.89 Mb	Chr 17: 65.94 – 65.95 Mb
PubMed search
- Wikidata
View/Edit Human	View/Edit Mouse

Thioredoxin domain-containing protein 2 is a protein that in humans is encoded by the TXNDC2 gene.
