= Thioredoxin 2 =

Protein found in humans

TXN2
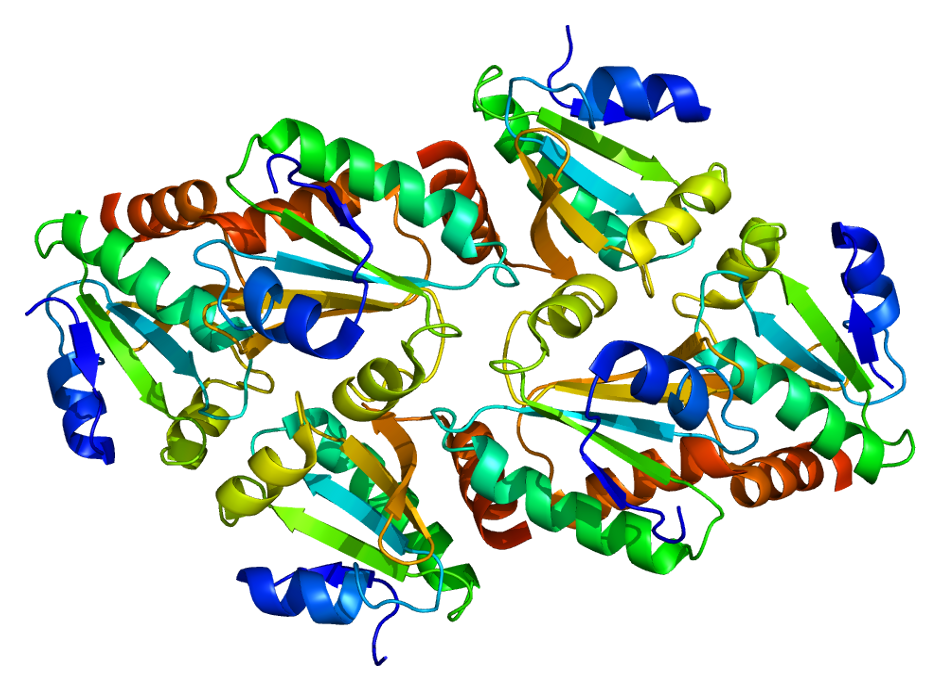

Identifiers
- Aliases: TXN2, MT-TRX, MTRX, TRX2, COXPD29, thioredoxin 2, TXN
- External IDs: OMIM: 609063; MGI: 1929468; GeneCards: TXN2
Available structures
PDB	Ortholog search: PDBe RCSB
PDB	List of PDB id codes 1UVZ, 1W4V, 1W89

Gene location (Mouse)
Chr.	Chromosome 15 (mouse)
Band	15|15 E1	Start	77,799,247 bp
Band	15|15 E1	End	77,813,206 bp
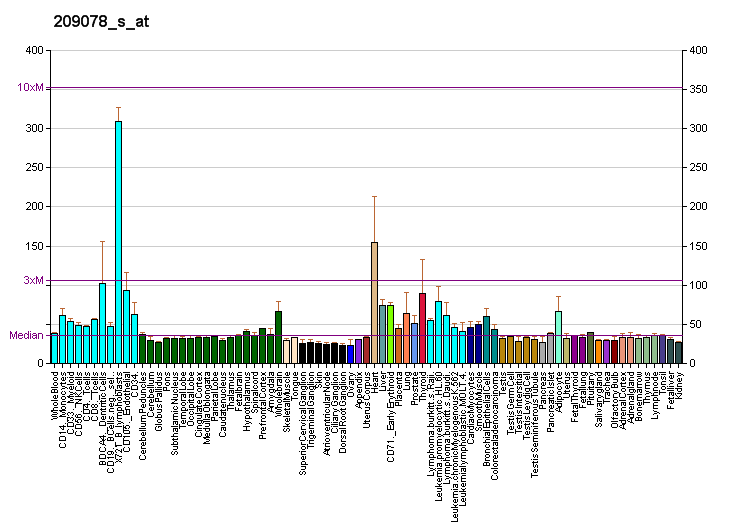

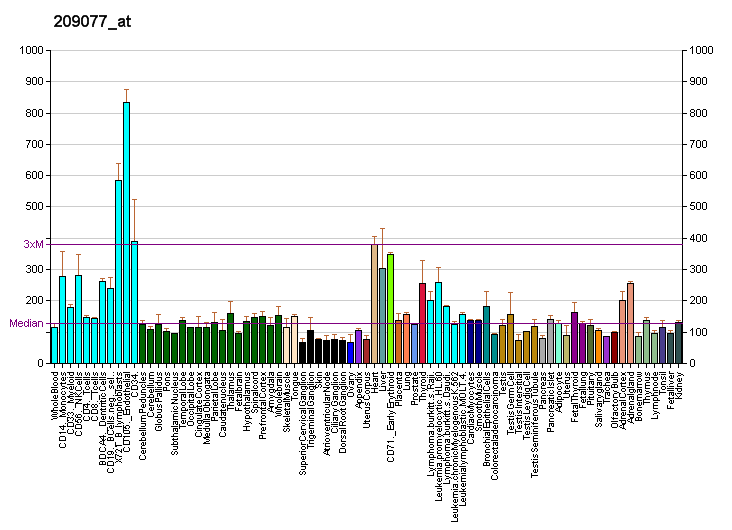
RNA expression pattern
Bgee	Human / Mouse (ortholog); Top expressed in: right adrenal gland; left adrenal gland; right lobe of liver; gastrocnemius muscle; body of stomach; left ventricle; nucleus accumbens; amygdala; right lobe of thyroid gland; left lobe of thyroid gland / Top expressed in: right kidney; muscle of thigh; adrenal gland; dentate gyrus of hippocampal formation granule cell; lip; right ventricle; brown adipose tissue; ventricular zone; embryo; proximal tubule; More reference expression data
BioGPS	More reference expression data
Gene ontology
Molecular function	peptide-methionine (S)-S-oxide reductase activity; peptide-methionine (R)-S-oxide reductase activity; protein binding; protein-disulfide reductase activity; protein-containing complex binding
Cellular component	nucleolus; mitochondrion; mitochondrial matrix; soma; dendrite
Biological process	response to hypoxia; response to hormone; cellular response to nutrient levels; response to organic cyclic compound; response to oxidative stress; glycerol ether metabolic process; response to axon injury; response to glucose; cell redox homeostasis; sulfur amino acid catabolic process
Sources:Amigo / QuickGO
Orthologs
Databases	NCBI: entry
Species	Human	Mouse
Entrez	25828	56551
Ensembl	n/a	ENSMUSG00000005354
UniProt	Q99757	P97493
RefSeq (mRNA)	NM_012473	NM_019913
RefSeq (protein)	NP_036605	NP_064297
Location (UCSC)	n/a	Chr 15: 77.8 – 77.81 Mb
PubMed search
- Wikidata
View/Edit Human	View/Edit Mouse

Thioredoxin 2, also known as mitochondrial thioredoxin, is a protein that in humans is encoded by the gene TXN2. This nuclear gene encodes a mitochondrial member of the thioredoxin family, a group of small multifunctional redox-active proteins. The encoded protein may play important roles in the regulation of the mitochondrial membrane potential and in protection against oxidant-induced apoptosis.

== Structure ==
As a thioredoxin, TXN2 is a 12-kDa protein characterized by the redox active site Trp-Cys-Gly-Pro-Cys. In its oxidized (inactive) form, the two cysteines form a disulfide bond. This bond is then reduced by thioredoxin reductase and NADPH to a dithiol, which serves as a disulfide reductase. In contrast to TXN1, TXN2 contains a putative N-terminal mitochondrial targeting sequence, responsible for its mitochondria localization, and lacks structural cysteines. Two mRNA transcripts of the TXN2 gene differ by ~330 bp in the length of the 3′-untranslated region, and both are believed to exist in vivo.

== Function ==
This nuclear gene encodes a mitochondrial member of the thioredoxin family, a group of small multifunctional redox-active proteins. The encoded protein is ubiquitously expressed in all prokaryotic and eukaryotic organisms, but demonstrates especially high expression in tissues with heavy metabolic activity, including the stomach, testis, ovary, liver, heart, neurons, and adrenal gland. It may play important roles in the regulation of the mitochondrial membrane potential and in protection against oxidant-induced apoptosis. Specifically, the ability of TXN2 to reduce disulfide bonds enables the protein to regulate mitochondrial redox and, thus, the production of reactive oxygen species (ROS). By extension, downregulation of TXN2 can lead to increased ROS generation and cell death. The antiapoptotic function of TXN2 is attributed to its involvement in GSH-dependent mechanisms to scavenge ROS, or its interaction with, and thus regulation of, thiols in the mitochondrial permeability transition pore component adenine nucleotide translocator (ANT).

Overexpression of TXN2 was shown to have attenuated hypoxia-induced HIF-1alpha accumulation, which is in direct opposition of the cytosolic TXN1, which enhanced HIF-1alpha levels. Moreover, although both TXN2 and TXN1 are able to reduce insulin, TXN2 does not depend on the oxidative status of the protein for this activity, a quality which may contribute to their difference in function.

== Clinical significance ==
It has been demonstrated that genetic polymorphisms in the TXN2 gene may be associated with the risk of spina bifida.

TXN2 is known to inhibit transforming growth factor (TGF)-β-stimulated ROS generation independent of Smad signaling. TGF-β is a pro-oncogenic cytokine that induces epithelial–mesenchymal transition (EMT), which is a crucial event in metastatic progression. In particular, TXN2 inhibits TGF-β-mediated induction of HMGA2, a central EMT mediator, and fibronectin, an EMT marker.

== Interactions ==
TXN2 is shown to interact with ANT.
