= TMX1 =

Protein-coding gene in the species Homo sapiens

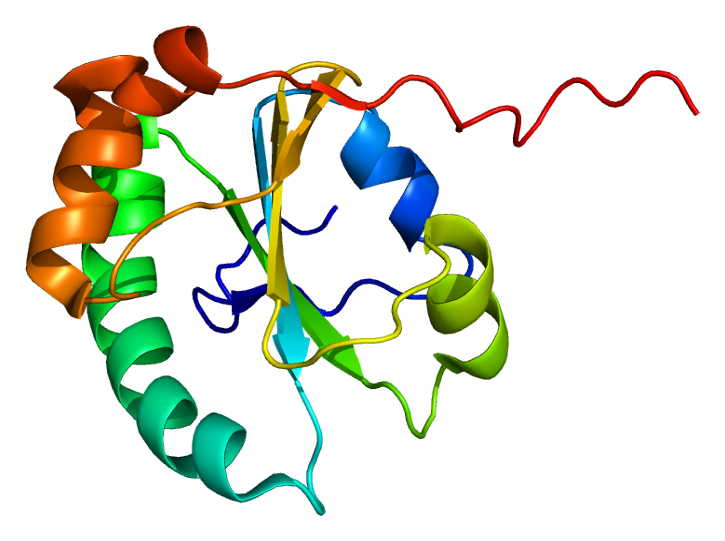

Identifiers
- Aliases: TMX1, PDIA11, TMX, TXNDC, TXNDC1, thioredoxin related transmembrane protein 1
- External IDs: OMIM: 610527; MGI: 1919986; GeneCards: TMX1
Available structures
PDB	Ortholog search: PDBe RCSB
PDB	List of PDB id codes 1X5E
Enzyme activity
EC #	BRENDA	ExPASy	KEGG	MetaCyc
5.3.4.1	↗	↗	↗	↗

Gene location (Human)
Chr.	Chromosome 14 (human)
Band	14q22.1	Start	51,240,162 bp
Band	14q22.1	End	51,257,655 bp

Gene location (Mouse)
Chr.	Chromosome 12 (mouse)
Band	12|12 C2	Start	70,499,869 bp
Band	12|12 C2	End	70,514,814 bp
RNA expression pattern
Bgee	Human / Mouse (ortholog); Top expressed in: tibia; skin of hip; mucosa of sigmoid colon; germinal epithelium; trabecular bone; oral cavity; skin of thigh; jejunal mucosa; superficial temporal artery; secondary oocyte / Top expressed in: retinal pigment epithelium; cumulus cell; ciliary body; epithelium of lens; Paneth cell; fossa; condyle; Epithelium of choroid plexus; aortic valve; supraoptic nucleus; More reference expression data
BioGPS	n/a
Gene ontology
Molecular function	disulfide oxidoreductase activity; protein disulfide isomerase activity
Cellular component	integral component of membrane; membrane; endoplasmic reticulum membrane; endoplasmic reticulum
Biological process	protein folding; response to endoplasmic reticulum stress; cell redox homeostasis
Sources:Amigo / QuickGO
Orthologs
Databases	NCBI: entry; OMA: entry
Species	Human	Mouse
Entrez	81542	72736
Ensembl	ENSG00000139921	ENSMUSG00000021072
UniProt	Q9H3N1	Q8VBT0
RefSeq (mRNA)	NM_030755	NM_028339
RefSeq (protein)	NP_110382	NP_082615
Location (UCSC)	Chr 14: 51.24 – 51.26 Mb	Chr 12: 70.5 – 70.51 Mb
PubMed search
- Wikidata
View/Edit Human	View/Edit Mouse

Thioredoxin-related transmembrane protein 1 is a protein that in humans is encoded by the TMX1 gene.
