= TMX3 =

Gene of the species Homo sapiens

Identifiers
- Aliases: TMX3, PDIA13, TXNDC10, thioredoxin related transmembrane protein 3
- External IDs: OMIM: 616102; MGI: 2442418; GeneCards: TMX3
Enzyme activity
EC #	BRENDA	ExPASy	KEGG	MetaCyc
5.3.4.1	↗	↗	↗	↗

Gene location (Mouse)
Chr.	Chromosome 18 (mouse)
Band	18|18 E4	Start	90,528,278 bp
Band	18|18 E4	End	90,561,391 bp
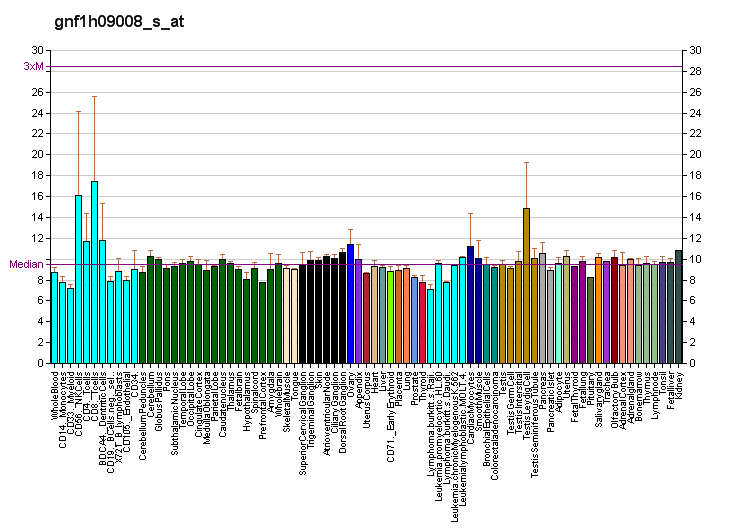

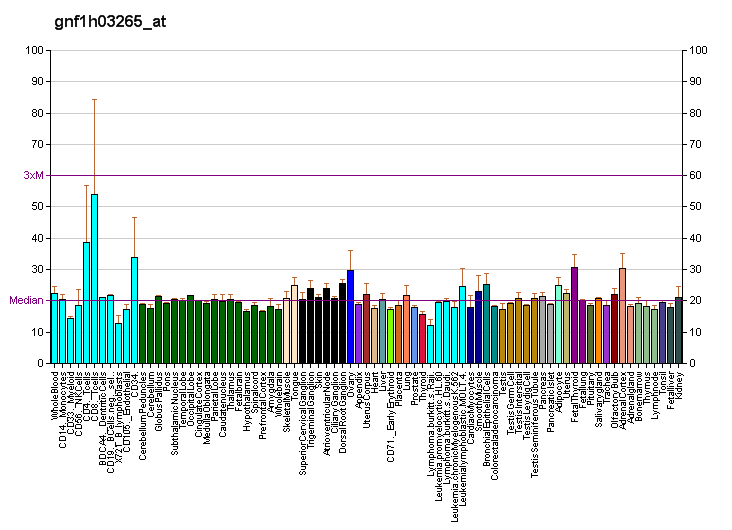
RNA expression pattern
Bgee	Human / Mouse (ortholog); n/a / Top expressed in: otolith organ; utricle; hand; superior cervical ganglion; olfactory epithelium; endothelial cell of lymphatic vessel; supraoptic nucleus; Epithelium of choroid plexus; substantia nigra; dorsomedial hypothalamic nucleus
BioGPS	More reference expression data
Gene ontology
Molecular function	protein binding; isomerase activity; thiol oxidase activity; protein disulfide isomerase activity
Cellular component	integral component of membrane; cell surface; endoplasmic reticulum membrane; endoplasmic reticulum; membrane; platelet alpha granule membrane; plasma membrane
Biological process	peptidyl-cysteine oxidation; protein folding; response to endoplasmic reticulum stress; cell redox homeostasis; platelet degranulation
Sources:Amigo / QuickGO
Orthologs
Databases	NCBI: entry; OMA: entry
Species	Human	Mouse
Entrez	54495	67988
Ensembl	ENSG00000166479	ENSMUSG00000024614
UniProt	Q96JJ7	Q8BXZ1
RefSeq (mRNA)	NM_019022	NM_198295
RefSeq (protein)	NP_061895; NP_001337441; NP_001337442; NP_001337443; NP_001337444 NP_001337445; NP_001337446	NP_938037
Location (UCSC)	n/a	Chr 18: 90.53 – 90.56 Mb
PubMed search
- Wikidata
View/Edit Human	View/Edit Mouse

Protein disulfide-isomerase TMX3 is an enzyme that in humans is encoded by the TMX3 gene.
