= ERP44 =

Protein-coding gene in the species Homo sapiens

ERp44
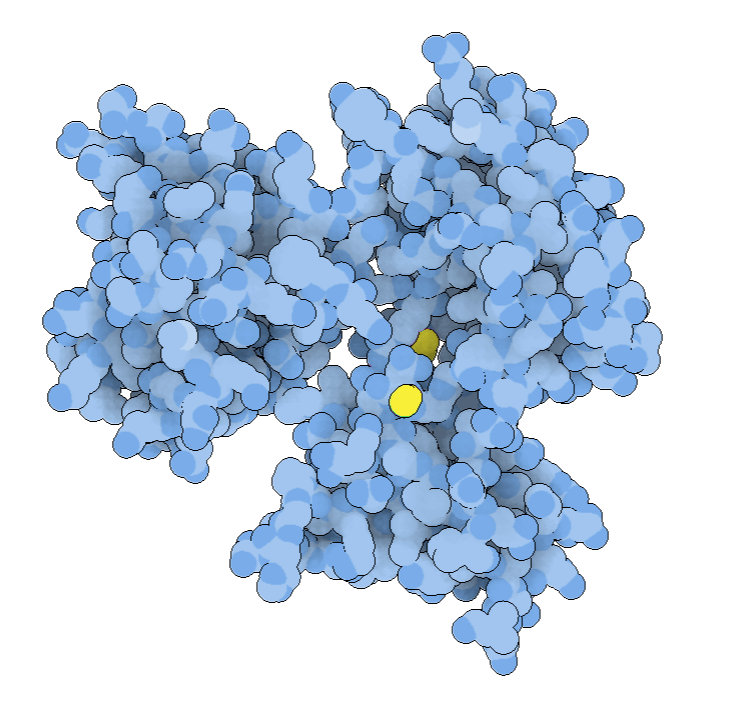

Identifiers
- Aliases: ERP44, PDIA10, TXNDC4, endoplasmic reticulum protein 44
- External IDs: OMIM: 609170; MGI: 1923549; GeneCards: ERP44
Available structures
PDB	Ortholog search: PDBe RCSB
PDB	List of PDB id codes 2R2J

Gene location (Human)
Chr.	Chromosome 9 (human)
Band	9q31.1	Start	99,979,185 bp
Band	9q31.1	End	100,099,052 bp

Gene location (Mouse)
Chr.	Chromosome 4 (mouse)
Band	4|4 B1	Start	48,193,323 bp
Band	4|4 B1	End	48,279,558 bp
RNA expression pattern
Bgee	Human / Mouse (ortholog); Top expressed in: beta cell; decidua; parotid gland; corpus epididymis; oocyte; jejunal mucosa; tendon of biceps brachii; mucosa of sigmoid colon; pericardium; tail of epididymis / Top expressed in: seminal vesicula; lacrimal gland; epithelium of stomach; decidua; mucous cell of stomach; crypt of lieberkuhn of small intestine; salivary gland; transitional epithelium of urinary bladder; left lobe of liver; gastrula; More reference expression data
BioGPS	n/a
Gene ontology
Molecular function	protein binding; protein disulfide isomerase activity
Cellular component	cell surface; endoplasmic reticulum lumen; extracellular exosome; endoplasmic reticulum membrane; endoplasmic reticulum; endoplasmic reticulum-Golgi intermediate compartment; extracellular region; specific granule lumen
Biological process	response to unfolded protein; glycoprotein metabolic process; protein folding; response to endoplasmic reticulum stress; cell redox homeostasis; neutrophil degranulation
Sources:Amigo / QuickGO
Orthologs
Databases	NCBI: entry; OMA: entry
Species	Human	Mouse
Entrez	23071	76299
Ensembl	ENSG00000023318	ENSMUSG00000028343
UniProt	Q9BS26	Q9D1Q6
RefSeq (mRNA)	NM_015051	NM_029572; NM_001355184
RefSeq (protein)	NP_055866	NP_083848; NP_001342113
Location (UCSC)	Chr 9: 99.98 – 100.1 Mb	Chr 4: 48.19 – 48.28 Mb
PubMed search
- Wikidata
View/Edit Human	View/Edit Mouse

Endoplasmic reticulum resident protein 44 (ERp44) also known as thioredoxin domain-containing protein 4 (TXNDC4) is a protein that in humans is encoded by the ERP44 gene.

== Interactions ==
TXNDC4 has been shown to interact with ERO1L.
