= DNAJC10 =

Protein-coding gene in the species Homo sapiens

Identifiers
- Aliases: DNAJC10, ERdj5, JPDI, MTHr, PDIA19, DnaJ heat shock protein family (Hsp40) member C10
- External IDs: OMIM: 607987; MGI: 1914111; GeneCards: DNAJC10
Available structures
PDB	Ortholog search: PDBe RCSB
PDB	List of PDB id codes 3APO, 3APQ, 3APS
Enzyme activity
EC #	BRENDA	ExPASy	KEGG	MetaCyc
1.8.4.2	↗	↗	↗	↗

Gene location (Human)
Chr.	Chromosome 2 (human)
Band	2q32.1	Start	182,716,255 bp
Band	2q32.1	End	182,794,464 bp

Gene location (Mouse)
Chr.	Chromosome 2 (mouse)
Band	2|2 C3	Start	80,145,810 bp
Band	2|2 C3	End	80,184,387 bp
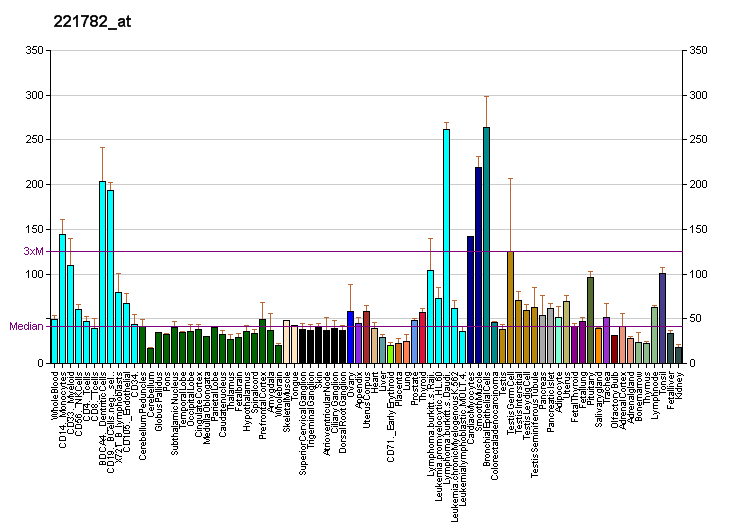

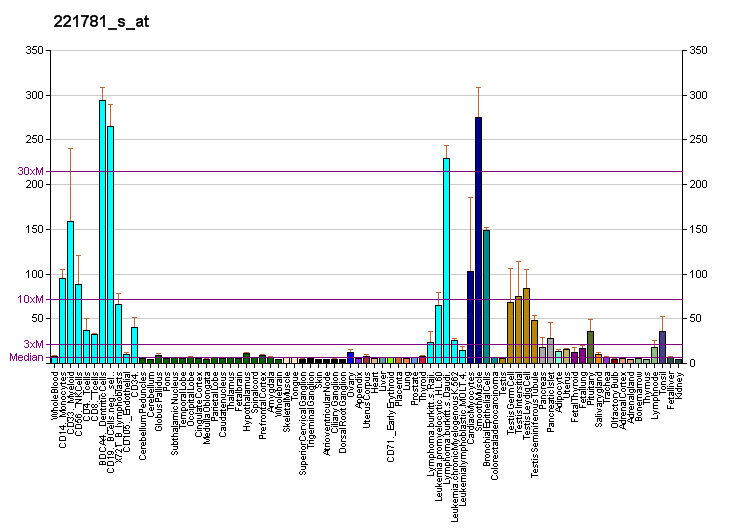
RNA expression pattern
Bgee	Human / Mouse (ortholog); Top expressed in: corpus epididymis; right uterine tube; bronchial epithelial cell; stromal cell of endometrium; tail of epididymis; Achilles tendon; caput epididymis; seminal vesicula; mucosa of paranasal sinus; islet of Langerhans / Top expressed in: spermatocyte; seminal vesicula; spermatid; medullary collecting duct; renal corpuscle; ureter; pyloric antrum; calvaria; tail of embryo; Paneth cell; More reference expression data
BioGPS	More reference expression data
Gene ontology
Molecular function	ATPase binding; misfolded protein binding; Hsp70 protein binding; protein binding; oxidoreductase activity; chaperone binding; ATPase activator activity; disulfide oxidoreductase activity; oxidoreductase activity, acting on a sulfur group of donors, disulfide as acceptor; protein-disulfide reductase activity
Cellular component	membrane; endoplasmic reticulum chaperone complex; endoplasmic reticulum lumen; endoplasmic reticulum
Biological process	negative regulation of protein phosphorylation; cell redox homeostasis; response to endoplasmic reticulum stress; intrinsic apoptotic signaling pathway in response to endoplasmic reticulum stress; ubiquitin-dependent ERAD pathway; positive regulation of ATP-dependent activity; protein folding in endoplasmic reticulum
Sources:Amigo / QuickGO
Orthologs
Databases	NCBI: entry; OMA: entry
Species	Human	Mouse
Entrez	54431	66861
Ensembl	ENSG00000077232	ENSMUSG00000027006
UniProt	Q8IXB1	Q9DC23
RefSeq (mRNA)	NM_001271581; NM_018981	NM_024181
RefSeq (protein)	NP_001258510; NP_061854	NP_077143
Location (UCSC)	Chr 2: 182.72 – 182.79 Mb	Chr 2: 80.15 – 80.18 Mb
PubMed search
- Wikidata
View/Edit Human	View/Edit Mouse

DnaJ homolog subfamily C member 10 is a protein that in humans is encoded by the DNAJC10 gene.
