= Thioredoxin =

Class of reduction–oxidation proteins

TXN
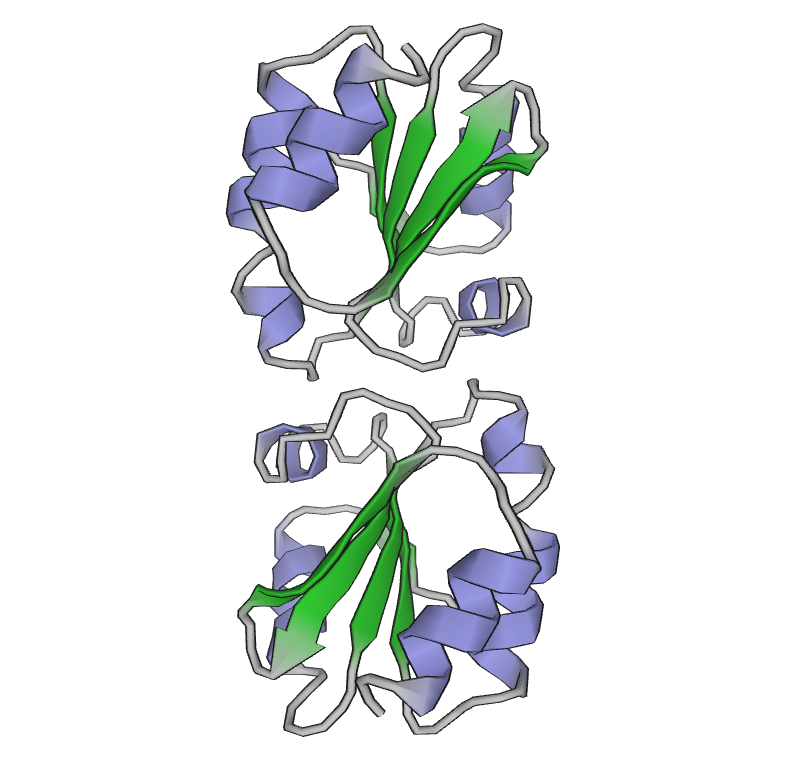

Identifiers
- Aliases: TXN, TRDX, TRX, TRX1, thioredoxin, Trx80
- External IDs: OMIM: 187700; MGI: 98874; GeneCards: TXN
Available structures
PDB	Ortholog search: PDBe RCSB
PDB	List of PDB id codes 4TRX, 1AIU, 1AUC, 1CQG, 1CQH, 1ERT, 1ERU, 1ERV, 1ERW, 1MDI, 1MDJ, 1MDK, 1TRS, 1TRU, 1TRV, 1TRW, 2HSH, 2HXK, 2IFQ, 2IIY, 3E3E, 3KD0, 3M9J, 3M9K, 3QFA, 3QFB, 3TRX, 4LL1, 4LL4, 4OO4, 4OO5, 4POK, 4POL, 4POM, 4PUF, 5DQY

Gene location (Human)
Chr.	Chromosome 9 (human)
Band	9q31.3	Start	110,243,810 bp
Band	9q31.3	End	110,256,507 bp

Gene location (Mouse)
Chr.	Chromosome 4 (mouse)
Band	4 B3|4 31.87 cM	Start	57,943,373 bp
Band	4 B3|4 31.87 cM	End	57,956,411 bp
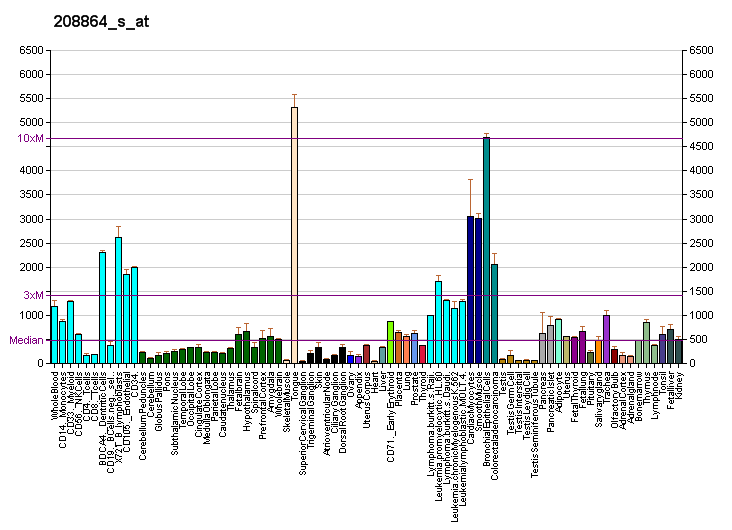
RNA expression pattern
Bgee	Human / Mouse (ortholog); Top expressed in: gingival epithelium; mucosa of pharynx; oral cavity; epithelium of nasopharynx; mucosa of sigmoid colon; mucosa of esophagus; mucosa of transverse colon; human penis; body of tongue; nasal epithelium / Top expressed in: jejunum; ileum; colon; granulocyte; duodenum; proximal tubule; synovial joint; thymus; esophagus; right kidney; More reference expression data
BioGPS	More reference expression data
Gene ontology
Molecular function	protein-disulfide reductase activity; oxidoreductase activity, acting on a sulfur group of donors, disulfide as acceptor; protein binding; thioredoxin-disulfide reductase activity; protein-disulfide reductase (NAD(P)) activity; RNA binding
Cellular component	extracellular region; extracellular exosome; nucleus; cytoplasm; mitochondrion; cytosol; nucleoplasm
Biological process	activation of protein kinase B activity; positive regulation of protein kinase B signaling; nucleobase-containing small molecule interconversion; glycerol ether metabolic process; regulation of transcription, DNA-templated; cell-cell signaling; negative regulation of transcription by RNA polymerase II; cell redox homeostasis; transcription, DNA-templated; positive regulation of peptidyl-serine phosphorylation; negative regulation of protein export from nucleus; response to radiation; positive regulation of DNA binding; negative regulation of hydrogen peroxide-induced cell death; cell population proliferation; signal transduction; protein repair; cellular oxidant detoxification; cellular response to oxidative stress
Sources:Amigo / QuickGO
Orthologs
Databases	NCBI: entry; OMA: entry
Species	Human	Mouse
Entrez	7295	22166
Ensembl	ENSG00000136810	ENSMUSG00000028367
UniProt	P10599	P10639
RefSeq (mRNA)	NM_003329; NM_001244938	NM_011660
RefSeq (protein)	NP_001231867; NP_003320	NP_035790
Location (UCSC)	Chr 9: 110.24 – 110.26 Mb	Chr 4: 57.94 – 57.96 Mb
PubMed search
- Wikidata
View/Edit Human	View/Edit Mouse

Thioredoxin (TRX or TXN), is a protein that in humans is encoded by the gene TXN (also called TXN1). More broadly, thioredoxins are a class of small redox proteins known to be present in all organisms which in humans includes both thioredoxin (TXN) and the mitochondrial form thioredoxin 2 (TXN2). These proteins play a role in many important biological processes, including redox signaling. Loss-of-function mutation of either of the two human thioredoxin genes is lethal at the four-cell stage of the developing embryo. Although not entirely understood, thioredoxin is linked to medicine through their response to reactive oxygen species (ROS). In plants, thioredoxins regulate a spectrum of critical functions, ranging from photosynthesis to growth, flowering and the development and germination of seeds. Thioredoxins play a role in cell-to-cell communication.

== Occurrence ==
They are found in nearly all known organisms and are essential for life in mammals.

== Function ==
The primary function of thioredoxin (Trx) is the reduction of oxidized cysteine residues and the cleavage of disulfide bonds. Multiple in vitro substrates for thioredoxin have been identified, including ribonuclease, choriogonadotropins, coagulation factors, glucocorticoid receptor, and insulin. Reduction of insulin is classically used as an activity test. The thioredoxins are maintained in their reduced state by the flavoenzyme thioredoxin reductase, in a NADPH-dependent reaction. Thioredoxins act as electron donors to peroxidases and ribonucleotide reductase. The related glutaredoxins share many of the functions of thioredoxins, but are reduced by glutathione rather than a specific reductase.

== Structure and mechanism ==
Thioredoxin is a 12-kD oxidoreductase protein. Thioredoxin proteins also have a characteristic tertiary structure termed the thioredoxin fold. The active site contains a dithiols in a CXXC motif. These two cysteines are the key to the ability of thioredoxin to reduce other proteins.

For Trx1, this process begins by attack of Cys32, one of the residues conserved in the thioredoxin CXXC motif, onto the oxidized group of the substrate. Almost immediately after this event Cys35, the other conserved Cys residue in Trx1, forms a disulfide bond with Cys32, thereby transferring 2 electrons to the substrate which is now in its reduced form. Oxidized Trx1 is then reduced by thioredoxin reductase, which in turn is reduced by NADPH as described above.

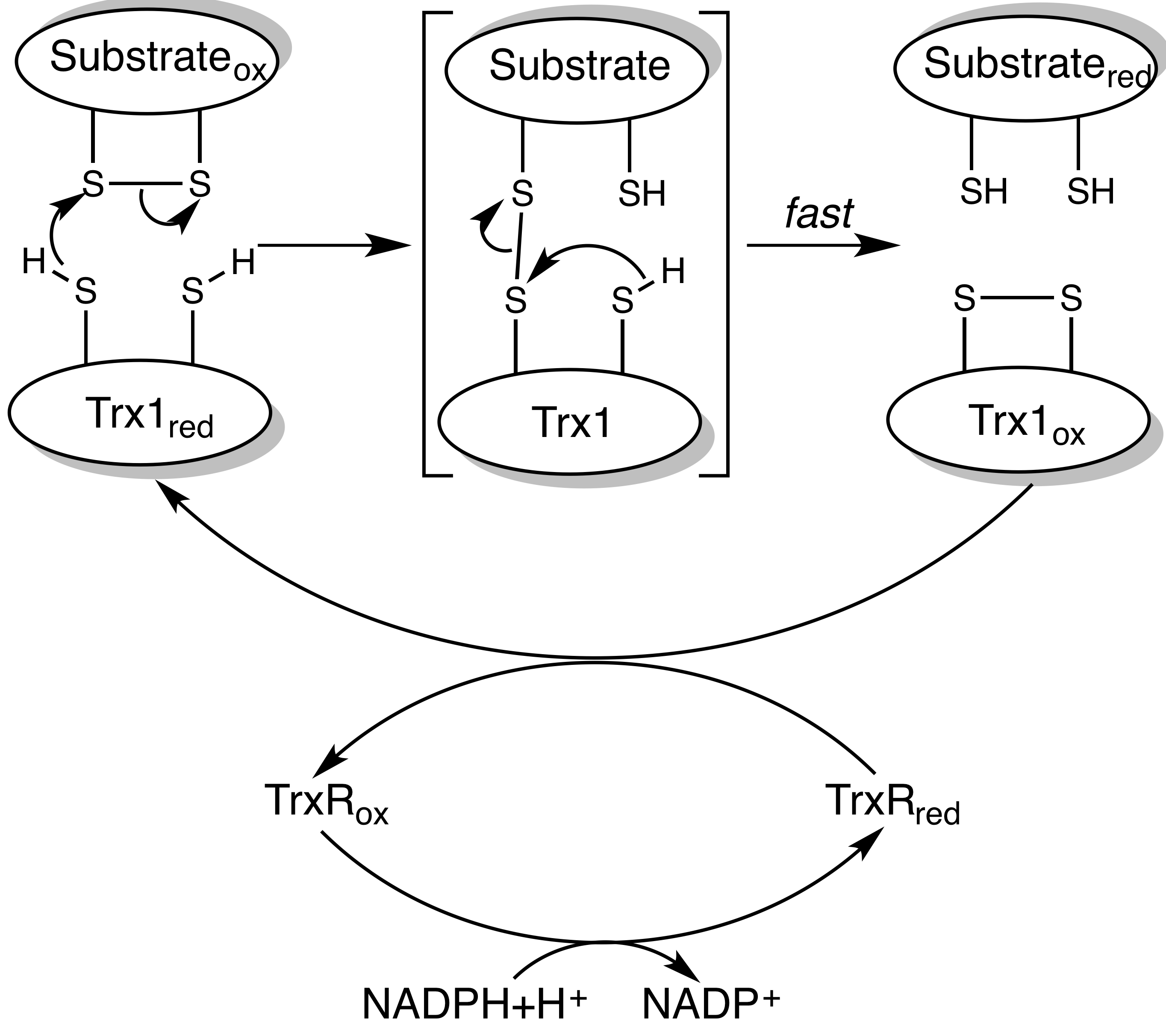
Mechanism of Trx1 reducing a substrate

Trx1 can regulate non-redox post-translational modifications. In the mice with cardiac-specific overexpression of Trx1, the proteomics study found that SET and MYND domain-containing protein 1 (SMYD1), a lysine methyltransferase highly expressed in cardiac and other muscle tissues, is also upregulated. This suggests that Trx1 may also play a role in protein methylation via regulating SMYD1 expression, which is independent of its oxidoreductase activity.

Plants have an unusually complex complement of Trx's composed of six well-defined types (Trxs f, m, x, y, h, and o) that reside in diverse cell compartments and function in an array of processes. Thioredoxin proteins move from cell to cell, representing a novel form of cellular communication in plants. Protein folding studies on Thioredoxin revealed that a minimum peptide length of 83 residues is required to acquire secondary and tertiary structure as shown by Ghosal et al. in 1999.

== Interactions ==
Thioredoxin has been shown to interact with:

- ASK1,
- Collagen, type I, alpha 1,
- Glucocorticoid receptor,
- SENP1,
- TXNIP.
- NF-κB – by reducing a disulfide bond in NF-κB, Trx1 promotes binding of this transcription factor to DNA.
- AP1 via Ref1 – Trx1 indirectly increases the DNA-binding activity of activator protein 1 (AP1) by reducing the DNA repair enzyme redox factor 1 (Ref-1), which in turn reduces AP1 in an example of a redox regulation cascade.
- AMPK – AMPK function in cardiomyocytes is preserved during oxidative stress due to an interaction between AMPK and Trx1. By forming a disulfide bridge between the two proteins, Trx1 prevents the formation and aggregation of oxidized AMPK, thereby allowing AMPK to function normally and participate in signaling cascades.

== Effect on cardiac hypertrophy ==
Trx1 has been shown to downregulate cardiac hypertrophy, the thickening of the walls of the lower heart chambers, by interactions with several different targets. Trx1 upregulates the transcriptional activity of nuclear respiratory factors 1 and 2 (NRF1 and NRF2) and stimulates the expression of peroxisome proliferator-activated receptor γ coactivator 1-α (PGC-1α). Furthermore, Trx1 reduces two cysteine residues in histone deacetylase 4 (HDAC4), which allows HDAC4 to be imported from the cytosol, where the oxidized form resides, into the nucleus. Once in the nucleus, reduced HDAC4 downregulates the activity of transcription factors such as NFAT that mediate cardiac hypertrophy. Trx 1 also controls microRNA levels in the heart and has been found to inhibit cardiac hypertrophy by upregulating miR-98/let-7. Trx1 can regulate the expression level of SMYD1, thus may indirectly modulate protein methylation for purpose of cardiac protection.

== Thioredoxin in skin care ==
Thioredoxin is used in skin care products as an antioxidant in conjunction with glutaredoxin and glutathione.

== Thioredoxin-like proteins ==
NrdH from Mycobacterium tuberculosis is a distinctive thioredoxin-like protein, functionally similar to thioredoxins but with a sequence more akin to glutaredoxins. Unlike typical glutaredoxins, NrdH can accept electrons from thioredoxin reductase (TrxR) to drive ribonucleotide reduction, a critical step in DNA synthesis. Structural analysis reveals a thioredoxin fold with conserved redox motifs—CVQC and WSGFRP—that form a hydrogen-bond network and hydrophobic patch, stabilizing TrxR binding. This unique blend of glutaredoxin sequence features with thioredoxin activity underscores NrdH's adaptive role in M. tuberculosis' redox regulation.

== See also ==
- RuBisCO - enzyme activity regulated by thioredoxin
- Peroxiredoxin - enzyme activity regulated by thioredoxin
- Thioredoxin fold
- Thioredoxin reductase
