= Amastatin =

Chemical compound

Clinical data
- ATC code: None

Identifiers
- IUPAC name: (2S)-2-[[(2S)-2-[[(2S)-2-[[(2S,3R)-3-Amino-2-hydroxy-5-methylhexanoyl]amino]-3-methylbutanoyl]amino]-3-methylbutanoyl]amino]butanedioic acid
- CAS Number: 67655-94-1
- PubChem CID: 439518
- ChemSpider: 388612
- UNII: A4GW7NV79V
- KEGG: C01552
- CompTox Dashboard (EPA): DTXSID10987015
- ECHA InfoCard: 100.131.532

Chemical and physical data
- Formula: C_{21}H_{38}N_{4}O_{8}
- Molar mass: 474.555 g·mol^{−1}
- 3D model (JSmol): Interactive image
- SMILES: CC(C)CC(C(C(=O)NC(C(C)C)C(=O)NC(C(C)C)C(=O)NC(CC(=O)O)C(=O)O)O)N
- InChI: InChI=1S/C21H38N4O8/c1-9(2)7-12(22)17(28)20(31)25-16(11(5)6)19(30)24-15(10(3)4)18(29)23-13(21(32)33)8-14(26)27/h9-13,15-17,28H,7-8,22H2,1-6H3,(H,23,29)(H,24,30)(H,25,31)(H,26,27)(H,32,33)/t12-,13+,15+,16+,17+/m1/s1; Key:QFAADIRHLBXJJS-ZAZJUGBXSA-N

Amastatin, also known as 3-amino-2-hydroxy-5-methylhexanoyl-L-valyl-L-valyl-L-aspartic acid, is a naturally occurring, competitive and reversible aminopeptidase inhibitor that was isolated from Streptomyces sp. ME 98-M3. It specifically inhibits leucyl aminopeptidase, alanyl aminopeptidase (aminopeptidase M/N), bacterial leucyl aminopeptidase (Aeromonas proteolytica aminopeptidase), leucyl/cystinyl aminopeptidase (oxytocinase/vasopressinase), and, to a lesser extent, glutamyl aminopeptidase (aminopeptidase A), as well as other aminopeptidases. It does not inhibit arginyl aminopeptidase (aminopeptidase B). Amastatin has been found to potentiate the central nervous system effects of oxytocin and vasopressin in vivo. It also inhibits the degradation of met-enkephalin, dynorphin A, and other endogenous peptides.

== See also ==
- Bestatin
- Pepstatin
