= Oxytocinase =

Class of enzymes

Oxytocinase is a type of enzyme that metabolizes the endogenous neuropeptide, oxytocin. The most well-characterized oxytocinase is leucyl/cystinyl aminopeptidase, which is also an enkephalinase. Other oxytocinases are also known. During pregnancy, oxytocinase plays a role in balancing concentration of oxytocin by degrading the oxytocin produced by the fetus, as production of oxytocin increases with growth of fetus. One study found that concentration level of oxytocinase increased progressively with gestational age until labor, which indicates that pregnancy development can be statistically evaluated by comparing oxytocinase levels.

== Inhibitors ==
Amastatin, bestatin (ubenimex), and puromycin have been found to inhibit the enzymatic degradation of oxytocin, though they also inhibit the degradation of various other peptides, such as vasopressin, met-enkephalin, and dynorphin A. EDTA, L-methionine, o-phenanthroline, and phosphoramidon have also been found to inhibit the enzymatic degradation of oxytocin.

== See also ==
- Enkephalinase inhibitor
