= C10H11NO =

The molecular formula C_{10}H_{11}NO (molar mass: 161.20 g/mol, exact mass: 161.084064 u) may refer to:

- Tryptophol
- Abikoviromycin
