= Oxytocin =

Peptide hormone and neuropeptide

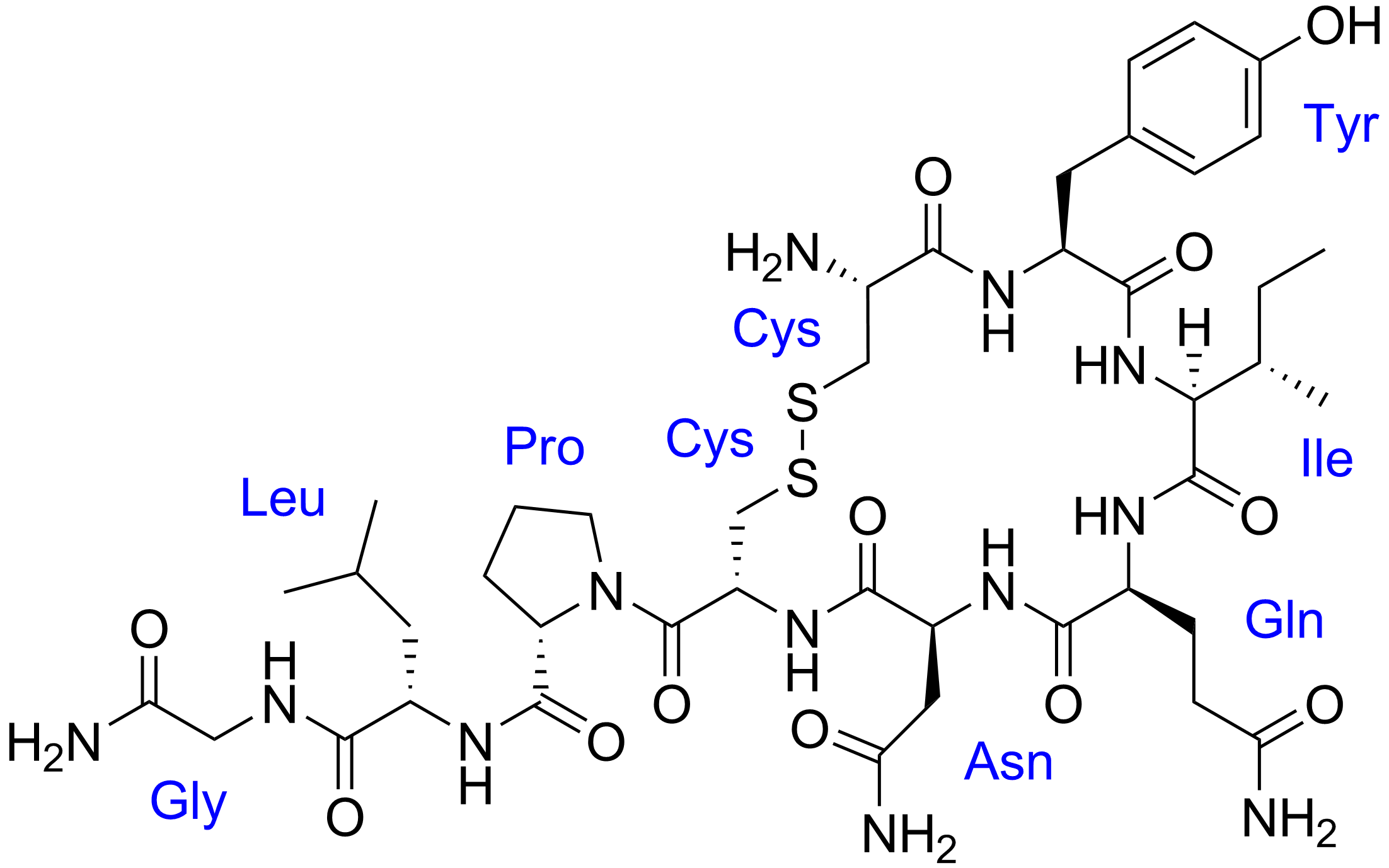

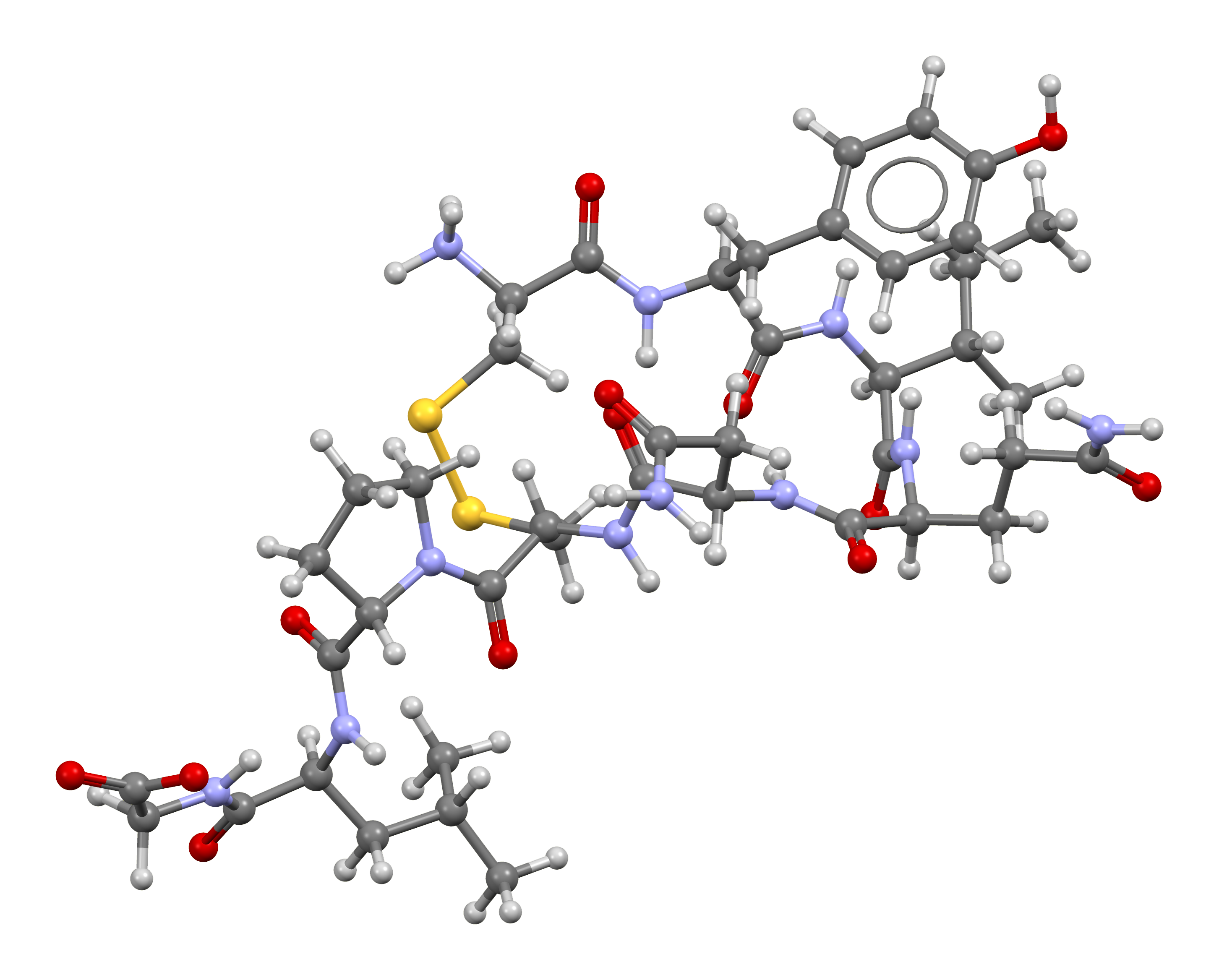

Clinical data
- Pronunciation: /ˌɒksɪˈtoʊsɪn/ OK-sih-TOH-sin
- Trade names: Induxin
- Drug class: Oxytocin receptor agonist
- ATC code: H01BB02 (WHO)

Physiological data
- Source tissues: Pituitary gland
- Target tissues: Wide spread
- Receptors: Oxytocin receptor
- Antagonists: Atosiban
- Precursor: Oxytocin/neurophysin I prepropeptide
- Metabolism: Liver and other oxytocinases

Pharmacokinetic data
- Protein binding: 30%
- Metabolism: Liver and other oxytocinases
- Elimination half-life: 1–6 min (IV); ~2 h (intranasal)
- Excretion: Biliary and kidney

Identifiers
- IUPAC name: 1-({(4R,7S,10S,13S,16S,19R)-19-amino-7-(2-amino-2-oxoethyl)-10-(3-amino-3-oxopropyl)-16-(4-hydroxybenzyl)-13-[(1S)-1-methylpropyl]-6,9,12,15,18-pentaoxo-1,2-dithia-5,8,11,14,17-pentaazacycloicosan-4-yl}carbonyl)-L-prolyl-L-leucylglycinamide
- CAS Number: 50-56-6
- PubChem CID: 439302
- IUPHAR/BPS: 2174
- DrugBank: DB00107
- ChemSpider: 388434
- UNII: 1JQS135EYN
- KEGG: D00089
- ChEBI: CHEBI:7872
- ChEMBL: ChEMBL395429
- CompTox Dashboard (EPA): DTXSID8048361
- ECHA InfoCard: 100.000.045

Chemical and physical data
- Formula: C_{43}H_{66}N_{12}O_{12}S_{2}
- Molar mass: 1007.19 g·mol^{−1}
- 3D model (JSmol): Interactive image
- SMILES: CC[C@H](C)[C@@H]1NC(=O)[C@H](Cc2ccc(O)cc2)NC(=O)[C@@H](N)CSSC[C@H](NC(=O)[C@H](CC(N)=O)NC(=O)[C@H](CCC(N)=O)NC1=O)C(=O)N3CCC[C@H]3C(=O)N[C@@H](CC(C)C)C(=O)NCC(N)=O
- InChI: InChI=1S/C43H66N12O12S2/c1-5-22(4)35-42(66)49-26(12-13-32(45)57)38(62)51-29(17-33(46)58)39(63)53-30(20-69-68-19-25(44)36(60)50-28(40(64)54-35)16-23-8-10-24(56)11-9-23)43(67)55-14-6-7-31(55)41(65)52-27(15-21(2)3)37(61)48-18-34(47)59/h8-11,21-22,25-31,35,56H,5-7,12-20,44H2,1-4H3,(H2,45,57)(H2,46,58)(H2,47,59)(H,48,61)(H,49,66)(H,50,60)(H,51,62)(H,52,65)(H,53,63)(H,54,64)/t22-,25-,26-,27-,28-,29-,30-,31-,35-/m0/s1; Key:XNOPRXBHLZRZKH-DSZYJQQASA-N

Oxytocin is a peptide hormone and neuropeptide normally produced in the hypothalamus and released by the posterior pituitary. Present in animals since early stages of evolution, in humans it plays roles in behavior that include social bonding, love, reproduction, childbirth, and the period after childbirth. Oxytocin is released into the bloodstream as a hormone in response to sexual activity and during childbirth. It is also available in pharmaceutical form. In either form, oxytocin stimulates uterine contractions to speed up the process of childbirth.

In its natural form, it also plays a role in maternal bonding and milk production. Production and secretion of oxytocin is controlled by a positive feedback mechanism, where its initial release stimulates production and release of further oxytocin. For example, when oxytocin is released during a uterine contraction at the start of childbirth, this stimulates the production and release of more oxytocin and an increase in the intensity and frequency of contractions. This process intensifies in frequency and continues until the triggering activity ceases. A similar process takes place during lactation and during sexual activity.

Oxytocin is derived by enzymatic splitting from the peptide precursor encoded by the human OXT gene. The deduced structure of the active nonapeptide is:

Cys – Tyr – Ile – Gln – Asn – Cys – Pro – Leu – Gly – NH_{2}, or CYIQNCPLG-NH_{2}.

== Etymology ==
The term "oxytocin" derives from the Greek ὀξυτόκιον (oxytokion), based on ὀξύς (oxús), meaning "sharp" or "swift", and τόκος (tókos), meaning "childbirth". The adjective form is "oxytocic", which refers to medicines that stimulate uterine contractions, to speed up the process of childbirth. Colloquially, it has been referred to as the "cuddle hormone," "hug hormone," or "love hormone" because of extensive evidence of its involvement in mating and social behavior. It is involved in mating behavior in animals as low as C. elegans.

== History ==
The uterine-contracting properties of the principle that would later be named oxytocin were discovered by British pharmacologist Henry Hallett Dale in 1906, and its milk ejection property was described by Ott and Scott in 1910 and by Schafer and Mackenzie in 1911. In 1909 the first clinical use of oxytocin was performed by William Blair-Bell to induce childbirth in patients with complications.

By the 1920s, oxytocin and vasopressin had been isolated from pituitary tissue and given their current names. Oxytocin's molecular structure was determined in 1952. In the early 1950s, American biochemist Vincent du Vigneaud found that oxytocin is made up of nine amino acids. He identified its amino acid sequence, the first polypeptide hormone to be sequenced. In 1953, du Vigneaud carried out the synthesis of oxytocin, the first polypeptide hormone to be synthesized. Du Vigneaud was awarded the Nobel Prize in Chemistry in 1955 for his work. Further work on different synthetic routes for oxytocin, as well as the preparation of analogues of the hormone (e.g. 4-deamido-oxytocin) was performed in the following decade by Iphigenia Photaki.

== Biochemistry ==
OXT

Identifiers
- Aliases: OXT, OT, OT-NPI, OXT-NPI, oxytocin/neurophysin I prepropeptide
- External IDs: OMIM: 167050; MGI: 97453; GeneCards: OXT

Gene location (Human)
Chr.	Chromosome 20 (human)
Band	20p13	Start	3,071,620 bp
Band	20p13	End	3,072,517 bp

Gene location (Mouse)
Chr.	Chromosome 2 (mouse)
Band	2 F1|2 63.24 cM	Start	130,418,093 bp
Band	2 F1|2 63.24 cM	End	130,418,974 bp
RNA expression pattern
Bgee	Human / Mouse (ortholog); Top expressed in: oocyte; testicle; hypothalamus; gonad; right lobe of liver; secondary oocyte; decidua; anterior pituitary; subcutaneous adipose tissue; right adrenal gland / Top expressed in: paraventricular nucleus of hypothalamus; supraoptic nucleus; arcuate nucleus; tibiofemoral joint; nucleus of stria terminalis; right ventricle; median eminence; gastrula; neck; lateral hypothalamus; More reference expression data
BioGPS	n/a
Gene ontology
Molecular function	oxytocin receptor binding; hormone activity; neurohypophyseal hormone activity; neuropeptide hormone activity
Cellular component	terminal bouton; extracellular region; cytoplasm; secretory granule; extracellular space
Biological process	response to amphetamine; regulation of digestive system process; ejaculation; positive regulation of hindgut contraction; female pregnancy; positive regulation of penile erection; response to steroid hormone; signal transduction; response to activity; regulation of heart rate; response to sucrose; positive regulation of ossification; positive regulation of synapse assembly; drinking behavior; hyperosmotic salinity response; male mating behavior; positive regulation of cytosolic calcium ion concentration; response to estradiol; regulation of sensory perception of pain; response to cAMP; response to cocaine; response to progesterone; positive regulation of blood pressure; development of the heart; negative regulation of urine volume; response to organic cyclic compound; negative regulation of gastric acid secretion; positive regulation of prostaglandin secretion; response to peptide hormone; maternal behavior; negative regulation of blood pressure; memory; positive regulation of norepinephrine secretion; social behavior; response to glucocorticoid; grooming behavior; response to prostaglandin E; eating behavior; response to ether; positive regulation of female receptivity; sleep; maternal aggressive behavior; positive regulation of synaptic transmission; response to electrical stimulus; positive regulation of uterine smooth muscle contraction; response to food; response to retinoic acid; positive regulation of renal sodium excretion; regulation of signaling receptor activity; G protein-coupled receptor signaling pathway
Sources:Amigo / QuickGO
Orthologs
Databases	NCBI: entry; OMA: entry
Species	Human	Mouse
Entrez	5020	18429
Ensembl	ENSG00000101405	ENSMUSG00000027301
UniProt	P01178	P35454
RefSeq (mRNA)	NM_000915	NM_011025
RefSeq (protein)	NP_000906	NP_035155
Location (UCSC)	Chr 20: 3.07 – 3.07 Mb	Chr 2: 130.42 – 130.42 Mb
PubMed search
- Wikidata
View/Edit Human	View/Edit Mouse

=== Biosynthesis ===
Oxytocin and vasopressin are the only known hormones released by the human posterior pituitary gland to act at a distance. However, oxytocin neurons make other peptides, including corticotropin-releasing hormone and dynorphin, for example, that act locally. The magnocellular neurons that make oxytocin are adjacent to magnocellular neurons that make vasopressin and are similar in many respects.

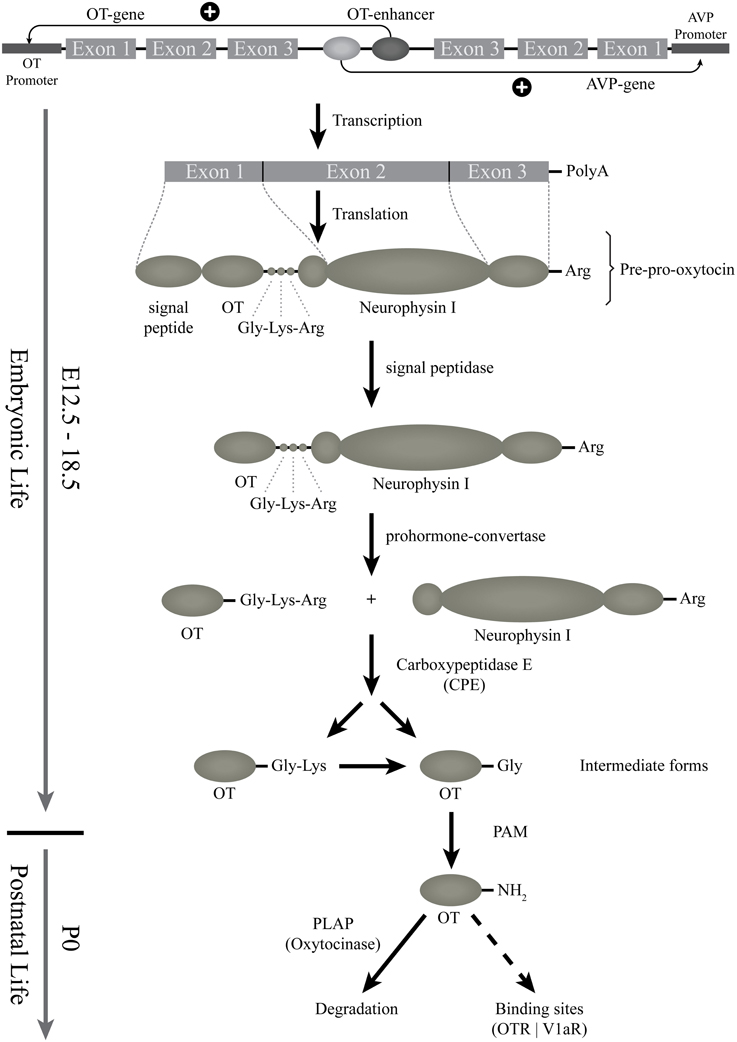
The biosynthesis of the different forms of OT

The oxytocin peptide is synthesized as an inactive precursor protein from the OXT gene. This precursor protein also includes the oxytocin carrier protein neurophysin I. The inactive precursor protein is progressively hydrolyzed into smaller fragments (one of which is neurophysin I) via a series of enzymes. The last hydrolysis that releases the active oxytocin nonapeptide is catalyzed by peptidylglycine alpha-amidating monooxygenase (PAM).

The activity of the PAM enzyme system is dependent upon vitamin C (ascorbate), which is a necessary vitamin cofactor. By chance, sodium ascorbate by itself was found to stimulate the production of oxytocin from ovarian tissue over a range of concentrations in a dose-dependent manner. Many of the same tissues (e.g. ovaries, testes, eyes, adrenals, placenta, thymus, pancreas) where PAM (and oxytocin by default) is found are also known to store higher concentrations of vitamin C.

Oxytocin is known to be metabolized by the oxytocinase, leucyl/cystinyl aminopeptidase. Other oxytocinases are also known to exist. Amastatin, bestatin (ubenimex), leupeptin, and puromycin have been found to inhibit the enzymatic degradation of oxytocin, though they also inhibit the degradation of various other peptides, such as vasopressin, met-enkephalin, and dynorphin A.

=== Neural sources ===
In the hypothalamus, oxytocin is made in magnocellular neurosecretory cells of the supraoptic and paraventricular nuclei, and is stored in Herring bodies at the axon terminals in the posterior pituitary. It is then released into the blood from the posterior lobe (neurohypophysis) of the pituitary gland. These axons (likely, but dendrites have not been ruled out) have collaterals that innervate neurons in the nucleus accumbens, a brain structure where oxytocin receptors are expressed. The endocrine effects of hormonal oxytocin, and the cognitive or behavioral effects of oxytocin neuropeptides are thought to be coordinated through its common release through these collaterals. Oxytocin is also produced by some neurons in the paraventricular nucleus that project to other parts of the brain and to the spinal cord. Depending on the species, oxytocin receptor-expressing cells are located in other areas, including the amygdala and bed nucleus of the stria terminalis.

In the pituitary gland, oxytocin is packaged in large, dense-core vesicles, where it is bound to neurophysin I as shown in the inset of the figure; neurophysin is a large peptide fragment of the larger precursor protein molecule from which oxytocin is derived by enzymatic cleavage.

The electrical activity of the oxytocin cells in the hypothalamus regulates the secretion of oxytocin from the neurosecretory nerve endings. These cells generate action potentials that propagate down axons to the nerve endings in the pituitary; the endings contain large numbers of oxytocin-containing vesicles, which are released by exocytosis when the nerve terminals are depolarised.

=== Non-neural sources ===
Endogenous oxytocin concentrations in the brain are as much as 1000-fold higher than peripheral levels. Outside the brain, oxytocin-containing cells have been identified in several diverse tissues, including in females in the corpus luteum and the placenta; in males in the testicles' interstitial cells of Leydig; and in both sexes in the retina, the adrenal medulla, the thymus and the pancreas. The finding of significant amounts of this classically "neurohypophysial" hormone outside the central nervous system raises many questions regarding its possible importance in these diverse tissues.

The Leydig cells in some species have been shown to possess the biosynthetic machinery to manufacture testicular oxytocin de novo, to be specific, in rats (which can synthesize vitamin C endogenously), and in guinea pigs, which, like humans, require an exogenous source of vitamin C in their diets. Oxytocin is synthesized by corpora lutea of several species, including ruminants and primates. Along with estrogen, it is involved in inducing the endometrial synthesis of prostaglandin F_{2α} to cause regression of the corpus luteum.

=== Evolution ===
Virtually all vertebrates have an oxytocin-like nonapeptide hormone that supports reproductive functions and a vasopressin-like nonapeptide hormone involved in water regulation. The two genes are usually located close to each other (fewer than 15,000 bases apart) on the same chromosome. They are transcribed in opposite directions (however, in fugu, the homologs are further apart and transcribed in the same direction). The two genes are believed to result from a gene duplication event; the ancestral gene is estimated to be about 500 million years old and is found in cyclostomata (modern members of the Agnatha).

A 2023 study found that zebrafish utilize oxytocin in reaction to the fear of other fish. It found that zebrafish oxytocin production, removed by gene editing, cannot respond to the fear of other fish. When oxytocin is injected back into the fish, they react again, suggesting they may have empathy regarding this emotion. Furthermore, because the same brain regions are involved as in mammals, the study suggests oxytocin-based empathy may have evolved from a common ancestor many millions of years ago.

=== Influences ===
A variety of circumstances and drugs have been found to affect oxytocin levels in humans.

Labor, breastfeeding, pregnancy, hypoglycemia, sexual self-stimulation, physical activity, and psychosocial stress all increase oxytocin levels in humans. Oxytocin levels increase 3- to 4-fold during pregnancy and increase a further 3- to 4-fold during labor. They also increase by 5-fold during breastfeeding. In premenopausal women, oxytocin levels are almost twice as high during ovulation and the luteal phase than during the follicular phase. Oxytocin levels are higher, by about 2-fold, in new romantic relationships. Levels of oxytocin are lower in underweight women with anorexia nervosa, returning to normal with recovery.

Estrogens such as estradiol and ethinylestradiol have been found to dose-dependently and robustly increase oxytocin levels in humans. In addition, they have been found to increase the expression of the oxytocin receptor in the brain. Controlled ovarian hyperstimulation can increase estradiol levels by around 90-fold and oxytocin levels by about 6.5-fold. Increased estrogen levels are thought to be involved in the increases in oxytocin levels during the ovulatory and luteal phases, during pregnancy, and in the premenopause compared to the postmenopause. Whereas estrogens unambiguously stimulate oxytocin production, findings appear to be mixed on the influence of androgens such as testosterone on oxytocin production and oxytocin receptor expression. However, dihydrotestosterone (DHT) metabolites acting as estrogen receptor beta (ERβ) agonists such as 3β-androstanediol may stimulate oxytocin production similarly to estrogens like estradiol.

The entactogen MDMA, which is a serotonin–norepinephrine–dopamine releasing agent (SNDRA), strongly increases oxytocin levels in humans, by 4- to 8-fold. This appears to play a key role in the drug's entactogenic effects, including its euphoria, enhanced empathy, and reduced anxiety. Stimulants like dextroamphetamine, methamphetamine, methylphenidate, and modafinil, with are catecholamine releasing agents and/or reuptake inhibitors, do not affect oxytocin levels in humans. However, in another study, methamphetamine increased oxytocin levels during dyadic conversations, albeit to a lesser extent than MDMA. 4-Fluoroamphetamine, which shows greater serotonin release than amphetamine or methamphetamine, increases oxytocin levels in humans. The serotonin–norepinephrine releasing agent (SNRA) fenfluramine increases oxytocin levels in humans as well. Serotonergic psychedelics including LSD, psilocybin, mescaline, and dimethyltryptamine (DMT) have been found to increase oxytocin levels in humans, though with much smaller increases in levels than MDMA. The serotonin 5-HT_{1A} receptor agonist buspirone does not affect oxytocin levels in humans, though it augmented the increase in oxytocin levels in response to hypoglycemia.

The neurotransmitter serotonin, a non-selective serotonin receptor agonist, strongly increases oxytocin levels, by up to 12-fold, when given via intracerebroventricular injection in rodents. This can be blocked by various serotonin receptor antagonists. Selective serotonin 5-HT_{1A} receptor agonists like 8-OH-DPAT, buspirone, and ipsapirone increase oxytocin levels in rodents. Both 8-OH-DPAT and buspirone maximally increased oxytocin levels by around 9-fold, whereas ipsapirone increased oxytocin levels by only around 3-fold. Similarly to serotonin 5-HT_{1A} receptor agonists, the serotonin 5-HT_{2} receptor agonist DOI increases oxytocin levels in rodents, with a maximal increase of around 5- to 10-fold depending on the dose. The serotonin 5-HT_{2A} receptor antagonist ketanserin reduced the increase in oxytocin levels induced by DOI by about 90%, while addition of the serotonin 5-HT_{2A}, 5-HT_{2B}, and 5-HT_{2C} receptor antagonist LY-53857 fully blocked the increase. The non-selective but preferential serotonin 5-HT_{2C} receptor agonist meta-chlorophenylpiperazine (mCPP) maximally increased oxytocin levels by around 6-fold, with the increases minimally affected by ketanserin but abolished by non-selective serotonin 5-HT_{2} receptor antagonists including LY-53857, mianserin, and metergoline. Another non-selective but preferential serotonin 5-HT_{2C} receptor agonist, MK-212, robustly increases oxytocin levels in rodents as well. The serotonin 5-HT_{3} receptor agonists SR-57277 and m-CPBG and the serotonin 5-HT_{4} receptor agonist RS-67506 increase oxytocin levels maximally by several-fold in rodents. Other serotonin receptors may also be involved. As such, numerous serotonin receptors appear to be involved in the regulation of oxytocin secretion.

Alcohol and γ-hydroxybutyrate (GHB), though producing acute anxiolytic and prosocial effects, do not affect oxytocin levels in humans.

Naturally, exogenous oxytocin increases oxytocin levels in humans. Single 16 to 40 IU doses of oxytocin increased oxytocin levels, with a peak of about 2- to 3-fold, albeit with a very short duration of around 1 to 1.5 hours. However, salivary oxytocin levels may remain elevated for longer, for instance more than 2 to 7 hours, though it is unclear that salivary oxytocin levels are a useful marker of oxytocin exposure. There is no correlation of circulating oxytocin with oxytocin in cerebrospinal fluid (CSF) with intranasal oxytocin administration and levels of oxytocin in CSF do not start to increase until 75 minutes post-administration.

== Biological function ==
Oxytocin has peripheral (hormonal) actions and also acts in the brain. Its actions are mediated by specific oxytocin receptors. The oxytocin receptor is a G protein-coupled receptor (GPCR), OT-R, which requires magnesium and cholesterol and is expressed in myometrial cells. It belongs to the rhodopsin-type (class I) group of G protein-coupled receptors.

Studies have looked at oxytocin's role in various behaviors, including orgasm, social recognition, pair bonding, anxiety, in-group bias, situational lack of honesty, autism, and maternal behaviors. Oxytocin is believed to have a significant role in social learning. There are indicators that oxytocin may help reduce noise in the brain's auditory system, increase perception of social cues, and support more targeted social behavior. It may also enhance reward responses. However, its effects may be influenced by context, such as the presence of familiar or unfamiliar individuals. In addition to its oxytocin receptor agonism, oxytocin has been found to act as a PAM of the μ- and κ-opioid receptors and this may be involved in its analgesic effects.

=== Physiological ===
The peripheral actions of oxytocin mainly reflect secretion from the pituitary gland. The behavioral effects of oxytocin are thought to reflect release from centrally projecting oxytocin neurons, different from those that project to the pituitary gland, or that are collaterals from them. Neurons express oxytocin receptors in many parts of the brain and spinal cord, including the amygdala, ventromedial hypothalamus, septum, nucleus accumbens, and brainstem. The distribution differs markedly between species. Furthermore, the distribution of these receptors changes during development and has been observed to change after parturition in the montane vole.

- Milk ejection reflex/Letdown reflex: in lactating (breastfeeding) mothers, oxytocin acts at the mammary glands, causing milk to be 'let down' into lactiferous ducts, from where it can be excreted via the nipple. Suckling by the infant at the nipple is relayed by spinal nerves to the hypothalamus. The stimulation causes neurons that produce oxytocin to fire action potentials in intermittent bursts; these bursts result in oxytocin pulses from the neurosecretory nerve terminals of the pituitary gland.
- Uterine contraction: important for cervical dilation before birth, oxytocin causes contractions during the second and third stages of labor. Oxytocin release during breastfeeding causes mild but often painful contractions during the first few weeks of lactation. This also assists the uterus in clotting the placental attachment point postpartum. However, in knockout mice lacking the oxytocin receptor, reproductive behavior and birth are normal.
- In male rats, oxytocin may induce erections. A burst of oxytocin is released during ejaculation in several species, including human males; its suggested function is to stimulate contractions of the reproductive tract, aiding sperm release.
- Human sexual response: Oxytocin levels in plasma rise during sexual stimulation and orgasm. At least two uncontrolled studies have found increases in plasma oxytocin at orgasm in both men and women. Plasma oxytocin levels are increased around the time of self-stimulated orgasm and are still higher than baseline when measured five minutes after self arousal. The authors of one of these studies speculated that oxytocin's effects on muscle contractibility may facilitate sperm and egg transport.

In a study measuring oxytocin serum levels in women before and after sexual stimulation, the author suggests it serves an important role in sexual arousal. This study found that genital tract stimulation resulted in increased oxytocin immediately after orgasm. Another study reported increases of oxytocin during sexual arousal could be in response to nipple/areola, genital, and/or genital tract stimulation as confirmed in other mammals. Murphy et al. (1987), studying men, found that plasma oxytocin levels remain unchanged during sexual arousal, but that levels increase sharply after ejaculation, returning to baseline levels within 30 minutes. In contrast, vasopressin was increased during arousal but returned to baseline at the time of ejaculation. The study concludes that (in males) vasopressin is secreted during arousal, while oxytocin is only secreted after ejaculation. A more recent study of men found an increase in plasma oxytocin immediately after orgasm, but only in a portion of their sample that did not reach statistical significance. The authors noted these changes "may simply reflect contractile properties on reproductive tissue".

- Due to its similarity to vasopressin, it can reduce the excretion of urine slightly, and so it can be classified as an antidiuretic. In several species, oxytocin can stimulate sodium excretion from the kidneys (natriuresis), and in humans high doses can result in low sodium levels (hyponatremia).
- Cardiac effects: oxytocin and oxytocin receptors are also found in the heart in some rodents, and the hormone may play a role in the embryonal development of the heart by promoting cardiomyocyte differentiation. However, the absence of either oxytocin or its receptor in knockout mice has not been reported to produce cardiac insufficiencies.
- Modulation of hypothalamic-pituitary-adrenal axis activity: oxytocin, under certain circumstances, indirectly inhibits release of adrenocorticotropic hormone and cortisol and, in those situations, may be considered an antagonist of vasopressin.
- Preparing fetal neurons for delivery (in rats): crossing the placenta, maternal oxytocin reaches the fetal brain and induces a switch in the action of neurotransmitter GABA from excitatory to inhibitory on fetal cortical neurons. This silences the fetal brain for the period of delivery and reduces its vulnerability to hypoxic damage.
- Feeding: A 2012 paper suggested that oxytocin neurons in the para-ventricular hypothalamus in the brain may play a key role in suppressing appetite under normal conditions and that other hypothalamic neurons may trigger eating via inhibition of these oxytocin neurons. This population of oxytocin neurons is absent in Prader-Willi syndrome, a genetic disorder that leads to uncontrollable feeding and obesity, and may play a key role in its pathophysiology. Research on the oxytocin-related neuropeptide asterotocin in starfish also showed that in echinoderms, the chemical induces muscle relaxation, and in starfish specifically caused the organisms to evert their stomach and react as though feeding on prey, even when none were present.

=== Psychological ===
- Autism: Oxytocin has been implicated in the etiology of autism, with one report suggesting autism is correlated to a mutation on the oxytocin receptor gene (OXTR). Studies involving Caucasian, Finnish and Chinese Han families provide support for the relationship of OXTR with autism. Autism may also be associated with an aberrant methylation of OXTR. However, evidence has shown that intranasal administration is likely insufficient to produce behavioural effects and it could be explained by publication bias and selective outcome reporting, impacting reproducibility of results. In addition, with focus being primarily on animal models that lack translational validity due to autism's complex social and communicative dimensions, current discussion has challenged the intervention and stated that neurodivergent perspectives need to be considered.
- Protection of brain functions: Studies in rats have demonstrated that nasal application of oxytocin can alleviate impaired learning capabilities caused by restrained stress. The authors attributed this effect to an improved hippocampal response in Brain-Derived Neurotrophic Factor (BDNF) being observed. Accordingly, oxytocin has been shown to promote neural growth in the hippocampus in rats even during swim stress or glucocorticoid administration. In a mouse model of early onset of Alzheimer's, the administration of oxytocin by a gel particularly designed to make the peptide accessible for the brain, the cognitive decline and hippocampal atrophy of these mice were delayed. Moreover, the amyloid β-protein deposit and nerve cell apoptosis were retarded. An observed inhibitory impact of oxytocin on the inflammatory activity of the microglia was proposed to be an important factor.

==== Bonding ====
In the prairie vole, oxytocin released into the brain of the female during sexual activity is important for forming a pair bond with her sexual partner. Vasopressin appears to have a similar effect in males. Oxytocin has a role in social behaviors in many species, so it likely also does in humans. In a 2003 study, both humans' and dogs' oxytocin levels in the blood rose after a five to 24-minute petting session. This possibly plays a role in the emotional bonding between humans and dogs.

- Maternal behavior: Female rats given oxytocin antagonists after giving birth do not exhibit typical maternal behavior. By contrast, virgin female sheep show maternal behavior toward foreign lambs upon cerebrospinal fluid infusion of oxytocin, which they would not do otherwise. Oxytocin is involved in the initiation of human maternal behavior, not its maintenance; for example, it is higher in mothers after they interact with unfamiliar children rather than their own.
- Human ingroup bonding: Oxytocin can increase positive attitudes, such as bonding, toward individuals classified as "in-group" members, whereas other individuals become classified as "out-group" members. Oxytocin has also been implicated in lying when lying would prove beneficial to other in-group members. In a study where such a relationship was examined, it was found that when individuals were administered oxytocin, rates of dishonesty in the participants' responses increased for their in-group members when a beneficial outcome for their group was expected. Both of these examples show the tendency of individuals to act in ways that benefit those considered to be members of their social group, or in-group.
- Decreased oxytocin and receptor expression has been associated with aggressive behavior in aggressive-impulsive disorders.

Oxytocin is not only correlated with individuals' preferences to associate with members of their own group, but it is also evident during conflicts between members of different groups. During conflict, individuals receiving nasally administered oxytocin demonstrate more frequent defense-motivated responses toward in-group members than out-group members. Further, oxytocin was correlated with participants' desire to protect vulnerable in-group members, despite that individual's attachment to the conflict. Similarly, it has been demonstrated that when oxytocin is administered, individuals alter their subjective preferences to align with in-group ideals over out-group ideals. These studies demonstrate that oxytocin is associated with intergroup dynamics. Further, oxytocin influences the responses of individuals in a particular group to those of another group. The in-group bias is evident in smaller groups; however, it can also extend to groups as large as one's entire country, leading to a strong national zeal. A study done in the Netherlands showed that oxytocin increased the in-group favoritism of their nation while decreasing acceptance of members of other ethnicities and foreigners. People also show more affection for their country's flag while remaining indifferent to other cultural objects when exposed to oxytocin. It has thus been hypothesized that this hormone may be a factor in xenophobic tendencies secondary to this effect. Thus, oxytocin appears to affect individuals at an international level where the in-group becomes a specific "home" country, and the out-group grows to include all other countries.

Some of the prosocial and antiaggressive effects of oxytocin may be mediated by vasopressin V_{1A} receptor agonism rather than by oxytocin receptor agonism. Conversely, other studies have implicated oxytocin receptor agonism in these effects of oxytocin.

==== Drugs ====
- Drug interaction: According to several studies in animals, oxytocin inhibits the development of tolerance to various addictive drugs (opiates, cocaine, alcohol), and reduces withdrawal symptoms. MDMA (ecstasy) may increase feelings of love, empathy, and connection to others by stimulating oxytocin activity primarily via activation of serotonin 5-HT_{1A} receptors, if initial studies in animals apply to humans. The anxiolytic drug buspirone may produce some of its effects via 5-HT_{1A} receptor-induced oxytocin stimulation as well.
- Addiction vulnerability: Concentrations of endogenous oxytocin can impact the effects of various drugs and one's susceptibility to substance use disorders, with higher concentrations associated with lower susceptibility. The status of the endogenous oxytocin system can enhance or reduce susceptibility to addiction through its bidirectional interaction with numerous systems, including the dopamine system, the hypothalamic–pituitary–adrenal axis, and the immune system. Individual differences in the endogenous oxytocin system based on genetic predisposition, gender and environmental influences, may therefore affect addiction vulnerability. Oxytocin may be related to the place conditioning behaviors observed in habitual drug abusers.

==== Fear and anxiety ====
Oxytocin is typically remembered for its effects on prosocial behaviors, such as its role in facilitating trust and attachment between individuals. However, oxytocin has a more complex role than solely enhancing prosocial behaviors. There is consensus that oxytocin modulates fear and anxiety; that is, it does not directly elicit fear or anxiety. Two dominant theories explain the role of oxytocin in fear and anxiety. One theory states that oxytocin increases approach/avoidance to certain social stimuli, and the second theory states that oxytocin increases the salience of certain social stimuli, causing animals (including humans) to pay closer attention to socially relevant stimuli.

Nasally administered oxytocin has been reported to reduce fear, possibly by inhibiting the amygdala (which is thought to be responsible for fear responses). Indeed, studies in rodents have shown oxytocin can efficiently inhibit fear responses by activating an inhibitory circuit within the amygdala. Some researchers have argued oxytocin has a general enhancing effect on all social emotions, since intranasal administration of oxytocin also increases envy and Schadenfreude. Individuals who receive an intranasal dose of oxytocin identify facial expressions of disgust more quickly than individuals who do not receive oxytocin, which may facilitate increased salience of cues related to contamination and contagion. In another study, after oxytocin administration, individuals displayed an enhanced ability to recognize expressions of fear compared to those who received the placebo. Oxytocin modulates fear responses by enhancing the maintenance of social memories. Rats who are genetically modified to have a surplus of oxytocin receptors display a greater fear response to a previously conditioned stressor. Oxytocin enhances the aversive social memory, leading the rat to display a greater fear response when the aversive stimulus is encountered again.

==== Mood and depression ====
Oxytocin produces antidepressant-like effects in animal models of depression, and a deficit of it may be involved in the pathophysiology of depression in humans. The antidepressant-like effects of oxytocin are not blocked by a selective antagonist of the oxytocin receptor, suggesting that these effects are not mediated by the oxytocin receptor. In accordance, unlike oxytocin, the selective non-peptide oxytocin receptor agonist WAY-267,464 does not produce antidepressant-like effects, at least in the tail suspension test. In contrast to WAY-267,464, carbetocin, a close analogue of oxytocin and peptide oxytocin receptor agonist, notably does produce antidepressant-like effects in animals. As such, the antidepressant-like effects of oxytocin may be mediated by modulation of a different target, perhaps the vasopressin V_{1A} receptor where oxytocin is known to weakly bind as an agonist.

Oxytocin mediates the antidepressant-like effects of sexual activity. A drug for sexual dysfunction, sildenafil enhances electrically evoked oxytocin release from the pituitary gland. In accordance, it may have promise as an antidepressant.

==== Sex differences ====
In humans, oxytocin differentially affects males and females. Females who are administered oxytocin are overall faster in responding to socially relevant stimuli than males who receive oxytocin. Additionally, after the administration of oxytocin, females show increased amygdala activity in response to threatening scenes; however, males do not show increased amygdala activation. This phenomenon can be explained by examining the role of gonadal hormones, specifically estrogen, which modulate the enhanced threat processing seen in females. Estrogen has been shown to stimulate oxytocin release from the hypothalamus and promote receptor binding in the amygdala.

It has also been shown that testosterone directly suppresses oxytocin in mice. This has been hypothesized to have evolutionary significance. With oxytocin suppressed, activities such as hunting and attacking invaders would be less mentally difficult as oxytocin is strongly associated with empathy.

==== Social ====
Because oxytocin plays a role in social bonding, maternal behaviors and emotional connections between people, it is also informally referred to as the "love hormone". This term is not a medical or scientific name but is often used to describe oxytocin's effects on human behavior and emotions.

- Affecting generosity by increasing empathy during perspective taking: In a neuroeconomics experiment, intranasal oxytocin increased generosity in the Ultimatum Game by 80%, but had no effect in the Dictator Game that measures altruism. Perspective-taking is not required in the Dictator Game. However, the researchers in this experiment explicitly induced perspective-taking in the Ultimatum Game by not informing participants which role they would be placed. Serious methodological questions have arisen, however, about the role of oxytocin in trust and generosity. Empathy in healthy males is increased after intranasal oxytocin This is most likely due to the effect of oxytocin in enhancing eye gaze. There is some discussion about which aspect of empathy oxytocin might alter – for example, cognitive vs. emotional empathy. While studying wild chimpanzees, it was noted that after a chimpanzee shared food with a non-kin related chimpanzee, the subjects' levels of oxytocin increased, as measured through their urine. In comparison to other cooperative activities between chimpanzees that were monitored, including grooming, food sharing generated higher levels of oxytocin. This comparatively higher level of oxytocin after food sharing parallels the increased level of oxytocin in nursing mothers, sharing nutrients with their kin.
- Trust is increased by oxytocin. Study found that with the oxytocin nasal spray, people place more trust to strangers in handling their money. Disclosure of emotional events is a sign of trust in humans. When recounting a negative event, humans who receive intranasal oxytocin share more emotional details and stories with more emotional significance. Humans also find faces more trustworthy after receiving intranasal oxytocin. In a study, participants who received intranasal oxytocin viewed photographs of human faces with neutral expressions and found them to be more trustworthy than those who did not receive oxytocin. This may be because oxytocin reduces the fear of social betrayal in humans. Even after experiencing social alienation by being excluded from a conversation, humans who received oxytocin scored higher in trust on the Revised NEO Personality Inventory. Moreover, in a risky investment game, experimental subjects given nasally administered oxytocin displayed "the highest level of trust" twice as often as the control group. Subjects who were told they were interacting with a computer showed no such reaction, leading to the conclusion that oxytocin was not merely affecting risk aversion. When there is a reason to be distrustful, such as experiencing betrayal, differing reactions are associated with oxytocin receptor gene (OXTR) differences. Those with the CT haplotype experience a stronger reaction, in the form of anger, to betrayal.
- Romantic attachment: In some studies, high levels of plasma oxytocin have been correlated with romantic attachment. For example, if a couple is separated for a long period of time, anxiety can increase due to the lack of physical affection. Oxytocin may aid romantically attached couples by increasing feelings of anxiety during separation.
- Group-serving dishonesty/deception: In a carefully controlled study exploring the biological roots of immoral behavior, oxytocin was shown to promote dishonesty when the outcome favored the group to which an individual belonged instead of just the individual.
- Oxytocin affects social distance between adult males and females, and may be responsible at least in part for romantic attraction and subsequent monogamous pair bonding. An oxytocin nasal spray caused men in a monogamous relationship, but not single men, to increase the distance between themselves and an attractive woman during a first encounter by 10 to 15 centimeters. The researchers suggested that oxytocin may help promote fidelity within monogamous relationships. For this reason, it is sometimes referred to as the "bonding hormone". There is some evidence that oxytocin promotes ethnocentric behavior, incorporating the trust and empathy of in-groups with their suspicion and rejection of outsiders. Furthermore, genetic differences in the oxytocin receptor gene (OXTR) have been associated with maladaptive social traits such as aggressive behavior.
- Social behavior and wound healing: Oxytocin is also thought to modulate inflammation by decreasing certain cytokines. Thus, the increased release in oxytocin following positive social interactions has the potential to improve wound healing. A study by Marazziti and colleagues used heterosexual couples to investigate this possibility. They found increases in plasma oxytocin following a social interaction were correlated with faster wound healing. They hypothesized this was due to oxytocin reducing inflammation, thus allowing the wound to heal more quickly. This study provides preliminary evidence that positive social interactions may directly influence aspects of health.
- According to a study published in 2014, silencing of oxytocin receptor interneurons in the medial prefrontal cortex (mPFC) of female mice resulted in loss of social interest in male mice during the sexually receptive phase of the estrous cycle. Oxytocin evokes feelings of contentment, reductions in anxiety, and feelings of calmness and security when in the company of the mate. This suggests oxytocin may be important for the inhibition of the brain regions associated with behavioral control, fear, and anxiety, thus allowing orgasm to occur. Research has also demonstrated that oxytocin can decrease anxiety and protect against stress, particularly in combination with social support. It is found that endocannabinoid signaling mediates oxytocin-driven social reward. During a 2008 study, a lack of oxytocin in mice was associated with abnormalities in emotional behavior. Another study conducted in 2014 saw similar results with a variation in the oxytocin receptor connected with dopamine transport and how levels of oxytocin are dependent on the levels of dopamine transporter levels.

== Chemistry ==
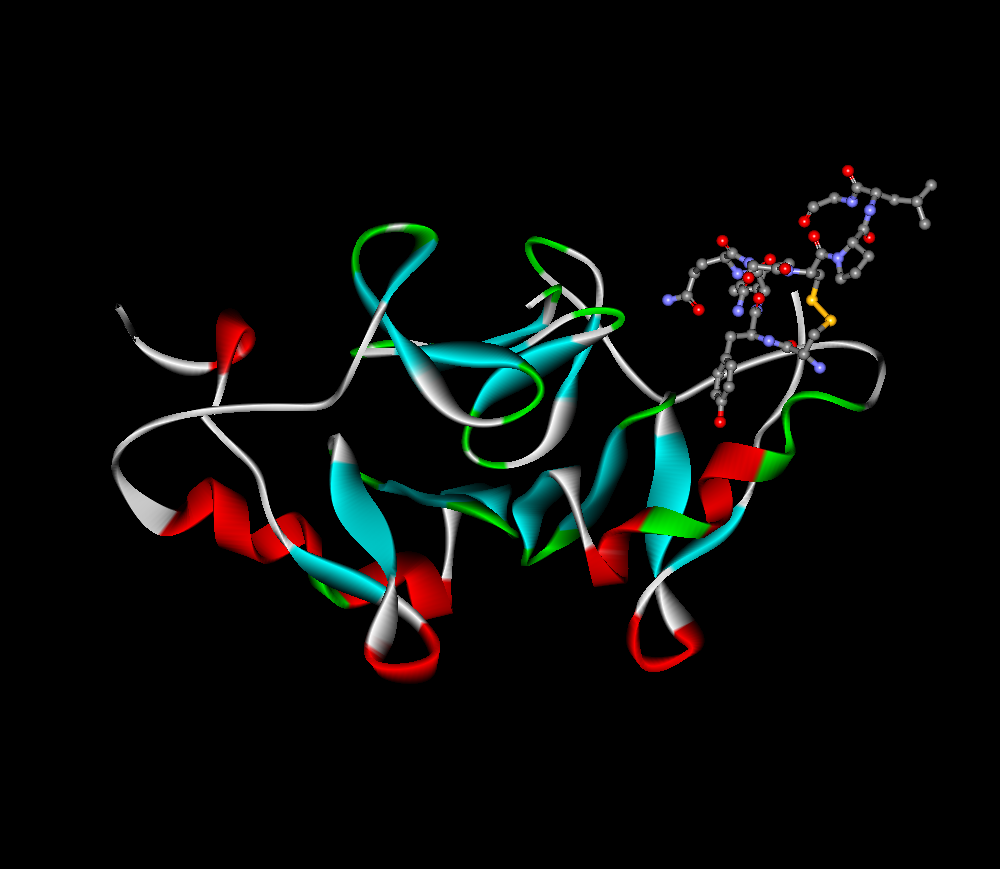
Oxytocin (ball-and-stick) bound to its carrier protein neurophysin (ribbons).

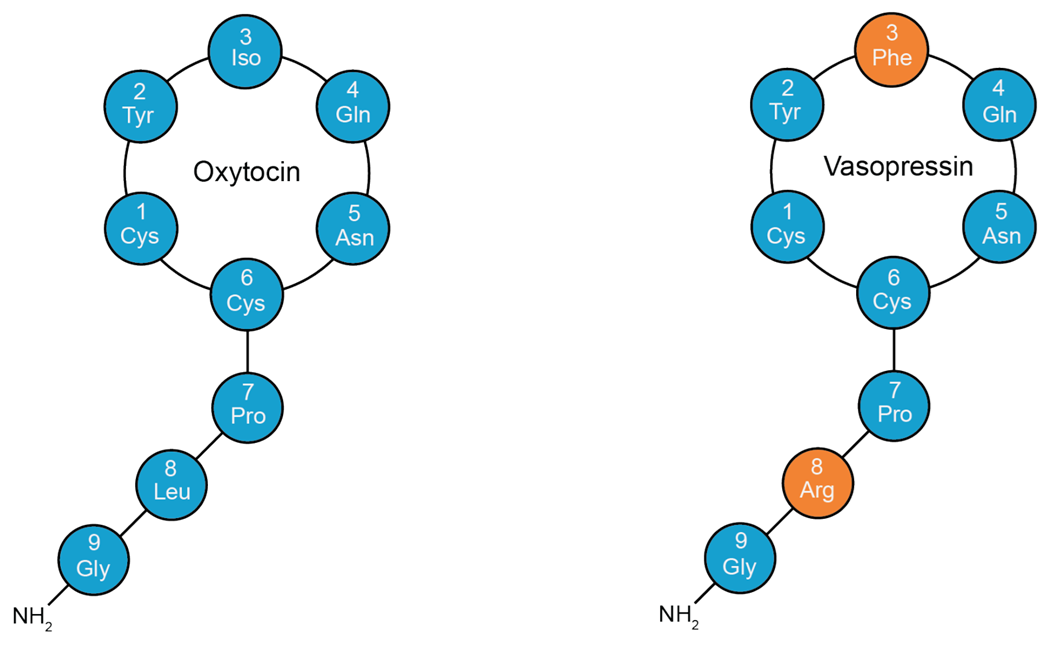
Oxytocin and vasopressin depicted as amino acid sequences.

Oxytocin is a peptide of nine amino acids (a nonapeptide) in the sequence cysteine-tyrosine-isoleucine-glutamine-asparagine-cysteine-proline-leucine-glycine-amide (Cys – Tyr – Ile – Gln – Asn – Cys – Pro – Leu – Gly – NH_{2}, or CYIQNCPLG-NH_{2}); its C-terminus has been converted to a primary amide and a disulfide bridge joins the cysteine moieties. Oxytocin has a molecular mass of 1007 Da, and one international unit (IU) of oxytocin is the equivalent of 1.68 μg of pure peptide.

While the structure of oxytocin is highly conserved in placental mammals, a novel structure of oxytocin was reported in 2011 in marmosets, tamarins, and other New World primates. Genomic sequencing of the gene for oxytocin revealed a single in-frame mutation (thymine for cytosine) which results in a single amino acid substitution at the 8-position (proline for leucine). Since this original Lee et al. paper, two other laboratories have confirmed Pro8-OT and documented additional oxytocin structural variants in this primate taxon. Vargas-Pinilla et al. sequenced the coding regions of the OXT gene in other genera in new world primates and identified the following variants in addition to Leu8- and Pro8-OT: Ala8-OT, Thr8-OT, and Val3/Pro8-OT. Ren et al. identified a variant further, Phe2-OT in howler monkeys.

Recent advances in analytical instrumental techniques highlighted the importance of liquid chromatography (LC) coupled with mass spectrometry (MS) for measuring oxytocin levels in various samples derived from biological sources. Most of these studies optimized the oxytocin quantification in electrospray ionization (ESI) positive mode, using [M+H]^{+} as the parent ion at mass-to-charge ratio (m/z) 1007.4 and the fragment ions as diagnostic peaks at m/z 991.0, m/z 723.2 and m/z 504.2. These important ion selections paved the way for the development of current methods of oxytocin quantification using MS instrumentation.

The structure of oxytocin is very similar to that of vasopressin. Both are nonapeptides with a single disulfide bridge, differing only by two substitutions in the amino acid sequence (differences from oxytocin bolded for clarity): Cys – Tyr – Phe – Gln – Asn – Cys – Pro – Arg – Gly – NH_{2}. Oxytocin and vasopressin were isolated and their total synthesis reported in 1954, work for which Vincent du Vigneaud was awarded the 1955 Nobel Prize in Chemistry with the citation: "for his work on biochemically important sulphur compounds, especially for the first synthesis of a polypeptide hormone."

Oxytocin and vasopressin are the only known hormones released by the human posterior pituitary gland to act at a distance. However, oxytocin neurons make other peptides, including corticotropin-releasing hormone and dynorphin, for example, that act locally. The magnocellular neurosecretory cells that make oxytocin are adjacent to magnocellular neurosecretory cells that make vasopressin. These are large neuroendocrine neurons which are excitable and can generate action potentials.

== In medicine ==
Small-molecule oxytocin receptor agonists like LIT-001 may prove to be useful in the treatment of social deficits, for instance in autism.

== See also ==
- Oxytocin (medication)
- Oxytocin receptor agonist
- Oxytocin deficiency
