= Bestatin (disambiguation) =

Bestatin is an alternative name for ubenimex, a protease inhibitor.

Bestatin may also refer to

- Bestatin, a trade name of atorvastatin, a lipid-lowering medication, in the Philippines
- Bestatin, a trade name of simvastatin, a lipid-lowering medication, in Pakistan and Thailand
