= GRWD5769 =

Clinical data
- Drug class: ERAP1 inhibitor

GRWD5769 is a first-in-class anti-cancer drug which acts as a selective inhibitor of the enzyme endoplasmic reticulum aminopeptidase 1 (ERAP1). It is in human clinical trials for the treatment of solid tumours including squamous cell carcinoma and cervical and liver cancers. Grey Wolf Therapeutics has filed several patents claiming phenylsulfamoyl benzoic acid derivatives as selective ERAP1 inhibitors useful in the treatment of cancer, but the exact chemical structure of GRWD5769 does not appear to have been disclosed as yet.
