= Pepstatin =

Names
- Other names Pepstatin A; Isovaleryl-Val-Val-Sta-Ala-Sta-OH

Identifiers
CAS Number	26305-03-3
3D model (JSmol)	Interactive image
ChEBI	CHEBI:7989
ChemSpider	4586014
ECHA InfoCard	100.043.258
KEGG	D03818
PubChem CID	5478883
UNII	V6Y2T27Q1U
CompTox Dashboard (EPA)	DTXSID7046095
- InChI: InChI=1S/C34H63N5O9/c1-17(2)12-23(37-33(47)31(21(9)10)39-34(48)30(20(7)8)38-27(42)14-19(5)6)25(40)15-28(43)35-22(11)32(46)36-24(13-18(3)4)26(41)16-29(44)45/h17-26,30-31,40-41H,12-16H2,1-11H3,(H,35,43)(H,36,46)(H,37,47)(H,38,42)(H,39,48)(H,44,45)/t22-,23-,24-,25-,26-,30-,31-/m0/s1 Key: FAXGPCHRFPCXOO-LXTPJMTPSA-N; InChI=1/C34H63N5O9/c1-17(2)12-23(37-33(47)31(21(9)10)39-34(48)30(20(7)8)38-27(42)14-19(5)6)25(40)15-28(43)35-22(11)32(46)36-24(13-18(3)4)26(41)16-29(44)45/h17-26,30-31,40-41H,12-16H2,1-11H3,(H,35,43)(H,36,46)(H,37,47)(H,38,42)(H,39,48)(H,44,45)/t22-,23-,24-,25-,26-,30-,31-/m0/s1 Key: FAXGPCHRFPCXOO-LXTPJMTPBX
- SMILES: O=C(N[C@H](C(=O)N[C@H](C(=O)N[C@@H](CC(C)C)[C@@H](O)CC(=O)N[C@H](C(=O)N[C@H]([C@@H](O)CC(=O)O)CC(C)C)C)C(C)C)C(C)C)CC(C)C

Properties
Chemical formula	C_{34}H_{63}N_{5}O_{9}
Molar mass	685.904 g·mol^{−1}
- Except where otherwise noted, data are given for materials in their standard state (at 25 °C [77 °F], 100 kPa). verify (what is ?) Infobox references

Pepstatin is a potent inhibitor of aspartyl proteases. It is a hexa-peptide containing the unusual amino acid statine (Sta, (3S,4S)-4-amino-3-hydroxy-6-methylheptanoic acid), having the sequence isovaleryl-Val-Val-Sta-Ala-Sta (Iva-Val-Val-Sta-Ala-Sta). It was originally isolated from cultures of various species of Actinomyces due to its ability to inhibit pepsin at picomolar concentrations. It was later found to inhibit nearly all acid proteases with high potency and, as such, has become a valuable research tool, as well as a common constituent of protease inhibitor cocktails.

Pepstatin A is well known to be an inhibitor of aspartic proteases such as pepsin, cathepsins D and E. Except for its role as a protease inhibitor, however, the pharmacological action of pepstatin A upon cells remain unclear. Pepstatin A suppresses receptor activator of NF-κB ligand (RANKL)–induced osteoclast differentiation. Pepstatin A suppresses the formation of multinuclear osteoclasts dose-dependently. This inhibition of the formation only affected osteoclast cells, i.e., not osteoblast-like cells. Furthermore, pepstatin A also suppresses differentiation from pre-osteoclast cells to mononuclear osteoclast cells dose-dependently. This inhibition seems to be independent of the activities of proteases such as cathepsin D, because the formation of osteoclasts was not suppressed with the concentration that inhibited the activity of cathepsin D. Cell signaling analysis indicated that the phosphorylation of ERK was inhibited in pepstatin A-treated cells, while the phosphorylation of IκB and Akt showed almost no change. Furthermore, pepstatin A decreased the expression of nuclear factor of activated T cells c1 (NFATc1). These results suggest that pepstatin A suppresses the differentiation of osteoclasts through the blockade of ERK signaling and the inhibition of NFATc1 expression.

Pepstatin is practically insoluble in water, chloroform, ether, and benzene, however it can be dissolved in methanol, ethanol, and DMSO with acetic acid, to between 1 and 5 mg/ml.

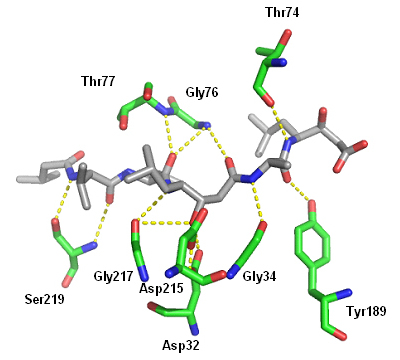
Structure of pepstatin in the binding pocket of pepsin. Hydrogen bonds between binding pocket residues and pepstatin are highlighted. Rendered from PDB 1PSO.

== See also ==
- Amastatin
- Bestatin
