= Statine =

Names
- IUPAC name (3S,4S)-4-amino-3-hydroxy-6-methylheptanoic acid

Identifiers
CAS Number	49642-07-1
3D model (JSmol)	Interactive image
Abbreviations	AHMHA, Sta
ChEBI	CHEBI:45769
ChemSpider	110446
ECHA InfoCard	100.161.428
PubChem CID	123915
UNII	YTC77XR1EK
CompTox Dashboard (EPA)	DTXSID00964315
- InChI: InChI=1S/C8H17NO3/c1-5(2)3-6(9)7(10)4-8(11)12/h5-7,10H,3-4,9H2,1-2H3,(H,11,12)/t6-,7-/m0/s1 Key: DFVFTMTWCUHJBL-BQBZGAKWSA-N
- SMILES: N[C@@H](CC(C)C)[C@@H](O)CC(O)=O

Properties
Chemical formula	C_{8}H_{17}NO_{3}
Molar mass	175.228 g·mol^{−1}
- Except where otherwise noted, data are given for materials in their standard state (at 25 °C [77 °F], 100 kPa). Infobox references

Statine is a gamma amino acid that occurs twice in the sequence of pepstatin, a protease inhibitor that is active against pepsin and other acid proteases. It is thought to be responsible for the inhibitory activity of pepstatin because it mimics the tetrahedral transition state of peptide catalysis.
