= Ubenimex =

Names
- IUPAC name N-[(2S,3R)-3-Amino-2-hydroxy-4-phenylbutanoyl]-L-leucine
- Systematic IUPAC name (2S)-2-[(2S,3R)-3-Amino-2-hydroxy-4-phenylbutanamido]-4-methylpentanoic acid
- Other names Bestatin; N-[(2S,3R)-3-Amino-2-hydroxy-4-phenylbutyryl]-L-leucine

Identifiers
CAS Number	58970-76-6; 65391-42-6 (HCl)
3D model (JSmol)	Interactive image
ChEBI	CHEBI:3070
ChEMBL	ChEMBL29292
ChemSpider	65145
DrugBank	DB03424
ECHA InfoCard	100.055.917
EC Number	261-529-2
KEGG	D00087
PubChem CID	72172
UNII	I0J33N5627
CompTox Dashboard (EPA)	DTXSID4048430
- InChI: InChI=1S/C16H24N2O4/c1-10(2)8-13(16(21)22)18-15(20)14(19)12(17)9-11-6-4-3-5-7-11/h3-7,10,12-14,19H,8-9,17H2,1-2H3,(H,18,20)(H,21,22)/t12-,13+,14+/m1/s1 Key: VGGGPCQERPFHOB-RDBSUJKOSA-N
- SMILES: CC(C)C[C@@H](C(=O)O)NC(=O)[C@H]([C@@H](CC1=CC=CC=C1)N)O

Properties
Chemical formula	C_{16}H_{24}N_{2}O_{4}
Molar mass	308.378 g·mol^{−1}
Melting point	245 °C (473 °F; 518 K) (decomposes)

Hazards
- GHS labelling
Pictograms	(GHS07: Exclamation mark)
Signal word	Warning
Hazard statements	H315, H319, H335
Precautionary statements	P261, P264, P271, P280, P302+P352, P304+P340, P305+P351+P338, P312, P321, P332+P313, P337+P313, P362, P403+P233, P405
- Except where otherwise noted, data are given for materials in their standard state (at 25 °C [77 °F], 100 kPa). verify (what is ?) Infobox references

Ubenimex (INN), also known more commonly as bestatin, is a competitive, reversible protease inhibitor. It is an inhibitor of arginyl aminopeptidase (aminopeptidase B), leukotriene A_{4} hydrolase (a zinc metalloprotease that displays both epoxide hydrolase and aminopeptidase activities), alanyl aminopeptidase (aminopeptidase M/N), leucyl/cystinyl aminopeptidase (oxytocinase/vasopressinase), and membrane dipeptidase (leukotriene D_{4} hydrolase). It is being studied for use in the treatment of acute myelocytic leukemia and lymphedema. It is derived from Streptomyces olivoreticuli. Ubenimex has been found to inhibit the enzymatic degradation of oxytocin, vasopressin, enkephalins, and various other peptides and compounds.

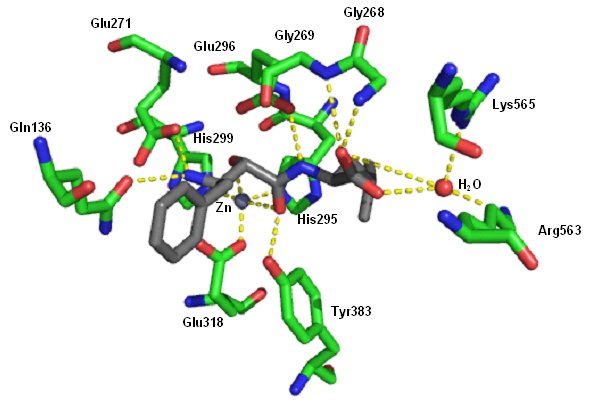
Crystal structure of ubenimex in the binding pocket of leukotriene A4 hydrolase. Rendered from PDB 1HS6.

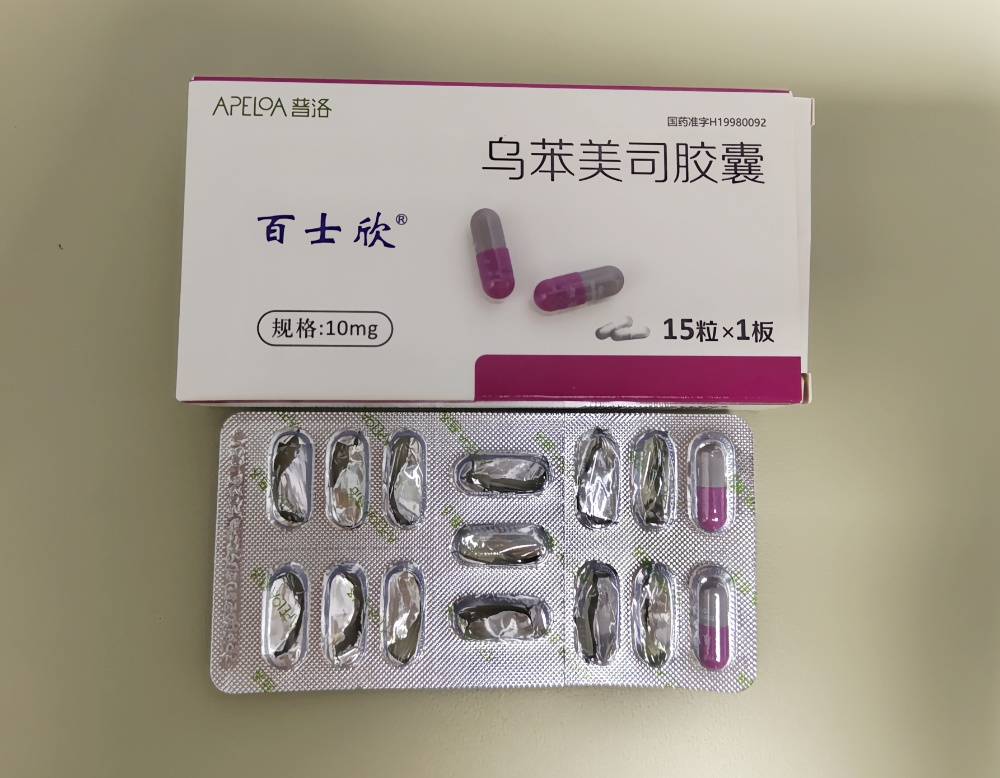
Ubenimex capsules sold in China

== See also ==
- Amastatin
- Pepstatin
