= Insulin regulated aminopeptidase =

Protein found in humans

LNPEP
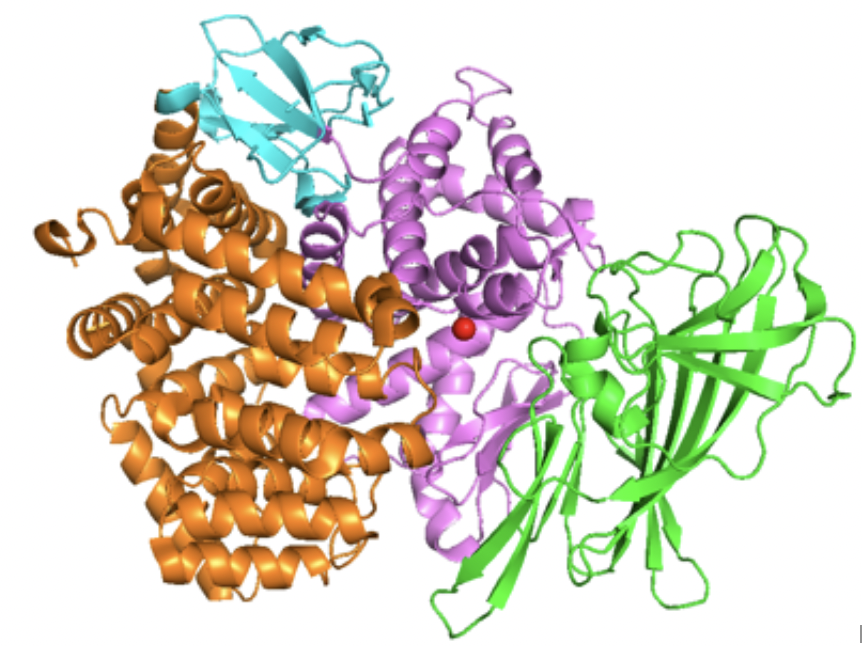

Identifiers
- Aliases: LNPEP, CAP, IRAP, P-LAP, PLAP, leucyl/cystinyl aminopeptidase, leucyl and cystinyl aminopeptidase, vasopressinase
- External IDs: OMIM: 151300; MGI: 2387123; GeneCards: LNPEP
Available structures
PDB	Ortholog search: PDBe RCSB
PDB	List of PDB id codes 4PJ6, 4P8Q, 4Z7I, 5C97
Enzyme activity
EC #	BRENDA	ExPASy	KEGG	MetaCyc
3.4.11.3	↗	↗	↗	↗

Gene location (Human)
Chr.	Chromosome 5 (human)
Band	5q15	Start	96,935,394 bp
Band	5q15	End	97,037,513 bp

Gene location (Mouse)
Chr.	Chromosome 17 (mouse)
Band	17|17 A3.2	Start	17,741,672 bp
Band	17|17 A3.2	End	17,845,312 bp
RNA expression pattern
Bgee	Human / Mouse (ortholog); Top expressed in: visceral pleura; Brodmann area 23; tibia; parietal pleura; epithelium of nasopharynx; superficial temporal artery; saphenous vein; germinal epithelium; middle temporal gyrus; trabecular bone / Top expressed in: ascending aorta; aortic valve; superior cervical ganglion; hand; ciliary body; mesenteric lymph nodes; otolith organ; utricle; stroma of bone marrow; skin of external ear; More reference expression data
BioGPS	n/a
Gene ontology
Molecular function	peptide binding; metal ion binding; peptidase activity; protein binding; aminopeptidase activity; metallopeptidase activity; metalloaminopeptidase activity; hydrolase activity; zinc ion binding
Cellular component	integral component of membrane; cytosol; membrane; plasma membrane; integral component of plasma membrane; intracellular anatomical structure; extracellular region; lysosomal membrane; perinuclear region of cytoplasm; early endosome lumen; cytoplasmic vesicle membrane
Biological process	SMAD protein signal transduction; female pregnancy; cell-cell signaling; protein polyubiquitination; antigen processing and presentation of exogenous peptide antigen via MHC class I, TAP-independent; proteolysis; regulation of blood pressure; protein catabolic process; membrane organization; signal transduction; peptide catabolic process
Sources:Amigo / QuickGO
Orthologs
Databases	NCBI: entry; OMA: entry
Species	Human	Mouse
Entrez	4012	240028
Ensembl	ENSG00000113441	ENSMUSG00000023845
UniProt	Q9UIQ6	Q8C129
RefSeq (mRNA)	NM_175920; NM_005575	NM_172827
RefSeq (protein)	NP_005566; NP_787116	NP_766415
Location (UCSC)	Chr 5: 96.94 – 97.04 Mb	Chr 17: 17.74 – 17.85 Mb
PubMed search
- Wikidata
View/Edit Human	View/Edit Mouse

Insulin regulated aminopeptidase (IRAP) is a protein that in humans is encoded by the leucyl and cystinyl aminopeptidase (LNPEP) gene. IRAP is a type II transmembrane protein which belongs to the oxytocinase subfamily of M1 aminopeptidases, alongside ERAP1 and ERAP2. It is also known as oxytocinase, leucyl and cystinyl aminopeptidase, placental leucine aminopeptidase (P-LAP), cystinyl aminopeptidase (CAP), and vasopressinase. IRAP is expressed in different cell types, mainly located in specialized regulated endosomes that can be recruited to the cell surface upon cell type-specific receptor activation.

== Biology / Functions ==
IRAP functions depend on the cell type and extracellular environment. For example, in adipocytes and muscle cells, IRAP is a major component of Glut4storage vesicles (GSV) and regulates GSV trafficking in response to insulin receptor signaling. Alteration of IRAP recruitment at the cell surface, as observed in type 2 diabetes, impairs glucose uptake by blocking the glucose transporter type 4 (Glut4) trafficking at the cell membrane. This evidence underlies a central function of the aminopeptidase in this disease.

IRAP cleaves several hormones, vasoactive peptides, and neuropeptides such as oxytocin, somatostatin, cholecystokinin, angiotensin III (Ang), Lys-bradykinin, arginin vasopressin, Met-and Leu-enkephalin, neurokinin A, and dynorphin A. Most of them have primary functions in the development of neurological disorders, including schizophrenia and memory disorders. Furthermore, an alteration in neuropeptide levels, due to IRAP deregulation, seems to be one of the mechanisms affecting learning and cognition processes, highlighting a fundamental function of IRAP also in memory disorders.

In the brain, IRAP is the major receptor of Ang IV, an essential component of the renin-angiotensin system which has been shown to have a neuroprotective effect. This evidence has prompted research on developing analogues with high IRAP selectivity, that show potential in memory enhancement, vascular regulation, and anticonvulsive/antiepileptogenic effects. These analogues were studied for neurodegenerative diseases, demonstrating improved stability and brain penetration, strong binding affinity to the targeted receptors, and positive effects on cognitive function and neuroprotection in animal models. IRAP inhibitors have also been found to counteract acetylcholine-induced vasoconstriction in vivo, highlighting IRAP's role in modulating vascular function. IRAP deletion reduces susceptibility to pentylenetetrazol-induced seizures in mice, suggesting its potential as epilepsy therapeutic target.

IRAP plays an important role in the regulation of the immune system. Similarly to ERAP1 and ERAP2, IRAP is able to trim the N-terminal of antigenic peptides, reducing their length to 8-10 amino acids, the optimal length for MHC class I binding. In contrast to ERAP1 and ERAP2, there is no evidence of IRAP-mediated trimming of antigenic peptides in the endoplasmic reticulum for the MHC-I presentation through the direct pathway. On the other hand, IRAP has a primary function in cross-presentation. Here, the aminopeptidase trims cross-presented peptides in a specific endosomal compartment, described in dendritic cells, before their loading on IRAP-associated MHC class I molecules.

IRAP stabilizes the particular type of regulated early endosomes it is located in. The stability of these endosomes is essential for the cross-presentation pathway in dendritic cells, and regulates several endosomal signaling pathways (TCR, TLR9, TNFα, IL-6) in other immune cell types. In T cells, IRAP regulates the trafficking of TCD3ζ chains, that are recruited to IRAP intracellular vesicles, as well as endosomal signalling by the TCR complex. IRAP depletion increases the TCR levels at the cell surface which, however, display defective signalling. Other studies demonstrated that IRAP regulates Toll-like receptor 9 (TLR9) activation by delaying maturation of TLR9-containing endosomes to lysosomes and limiting, as a consequence, TLR9 cleavage and activation. Finally, IRAP has an important role in the secretion of the proinflammatory cytokines TNFa and IL-6 by mast cells. In the absence of IRAP, the trafficking of vesicles containing TNFα and IL-6 from the Golgi to the plasma membrane is impaired.

== Genetics / Clinical significance ==
=== Gene location ===
IRAP is encoded by the LNPEP (leucyl and cystinyl aminopeptidase) gene, located on chromosome 5q15. This gene is ~75 kb in length and consists of 18 exons and 17 introns. According to ensembl.org, LNPEP has 5 transcripts but only one major expressed isoform (NM_005575.3).

=== SNPs ===
Among the different genetic variants identified so far, several single nucleotide variants have been associated with diseases. The vast majority of single nucleotide variants in LNPEP are intronic variants that are part of an extended haplotype that functions as a transcriptional enhancer of the adjacent gene ERAP2 but does not regulate LNPEP expression. In fact, compared to its M1- aminopeptidase family members ERAP1 and ERAP2, LNPEP shows low tolerance to protein-truncating genetic variation and contains few loss-of-function variants in its gene.

=== Disease association ===
LNPEP has five common (>1% in GnomAD) missense variants of which the most common rs2303138, leading to an amino acid substitution (Ala763Thr), has been related to psoriasis and ankylosing spondylitis risk. IRAP's precise role in these conditions remains unknown but given its involvement in activation of adaptive and innate immune responses, the renin-angiotensin system (RAS) and glucose metabolism, these genetic variants may have pleiotropic impacts on immune, circulatory, and metabolic systems. Two other common missense variants rs41276279 (p. Val373Ile) and rs11746232 (p. Ile963Val) moderately correlate with LNPEP gene expression levels (reference to gtexportal.org) but have not been linked to disease so far.

== Structure / Mechanism ==
=== Structure ===
The human IRAP gene encodes a type II transmembrane protein that consists of three distinct domains: an N-terminal cytoplasmic domain containing 109 amino acids, a transmembrane domain of 23 amino acids, and an intraluminal (or extracellular) domain composed of 893 amino acids. The C-terminal intra-endosomal domain harbours the Zn-binding motif known as HEXXH(X)18E, as well as the exopeptidase motif GAMEN. These two motifs are also present in ERAP1 and ERAP2 and are shared among all members of the M1 family of aminopeptidases. The C-terminal domain has been crystallized as a dimer, each monomer consisting of four continuous domains and forming a closed hollow structure with the active site at its center. Domain I (residues 171–365) forms an extensive β-sandwich with a seven-stranded β-saddle flanked on either side by three- and four-stranded β-sheets. Domain II (residues 366–615) contains the catalytic site with a Zn ion at its center. The catalytic Zn ion is coordinated by His464, His468, and Glu487 of HEXXH(X)18-E zinc-binding motif. Domain III (residues 616–704) adopts a β-sandwich fold consisting of three and four-stranded β-sheets and forms a bridge between domains II and IV. Domain IV (residues 705–1025) consists of α-helices and assemble in a "bowl-like" shape. The active site of IRAP is capped by domain IV to form a large, mostly enclosed cavity adjacent to the Zn ion.

=== Mechanism ===
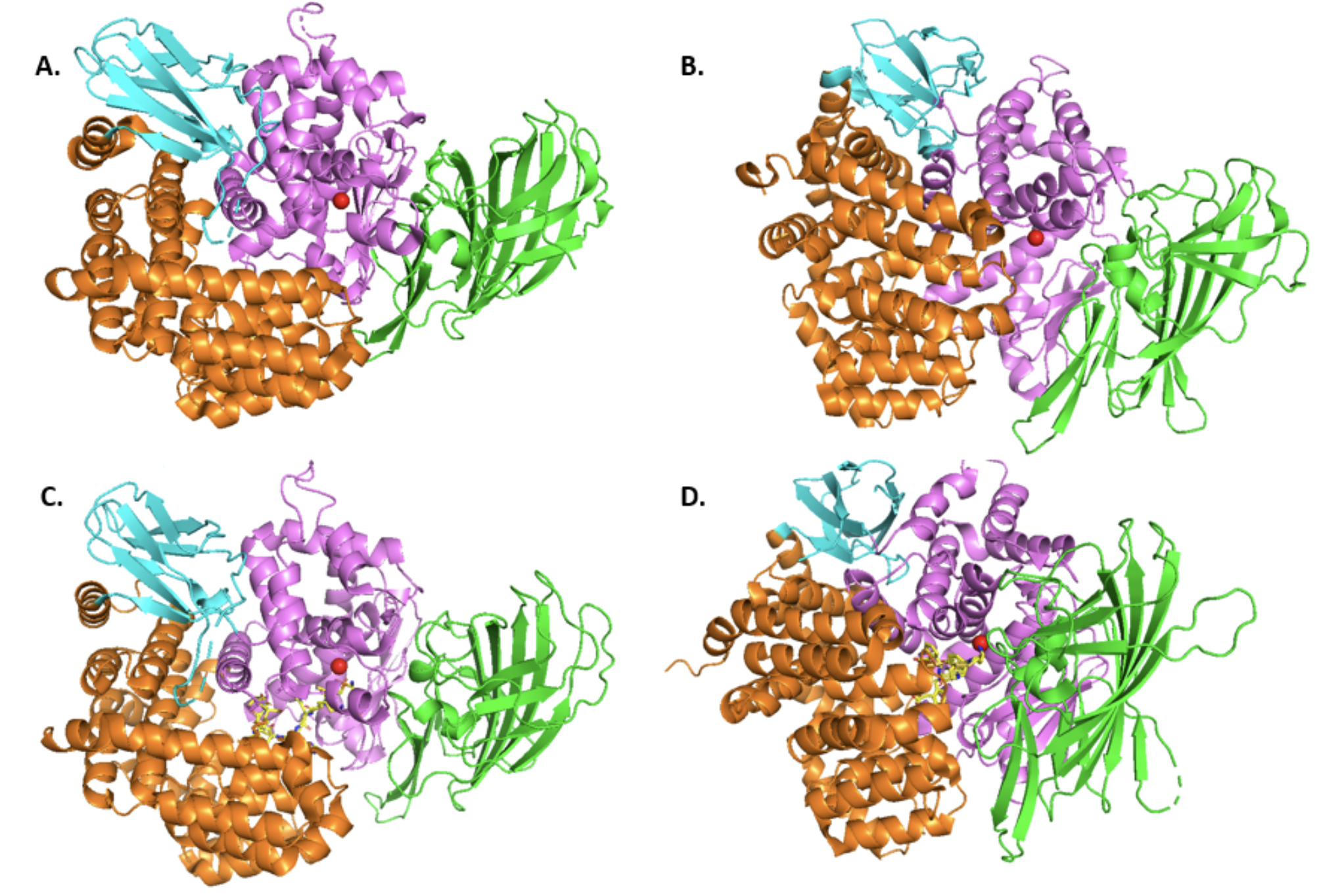
Figure 1. Crystal structures of IRAP in different conformations. The four domains are depicted in green, violet, cyan and orange for Domain I, II, III and IV respectively. The zinc atom is shown as a red sphere and the compounds co-crystallized with the enzyme are shown in yellow. A. Crystal structure in the closed conformation (PDB ID 4P8Q), B. Crystal structure in the open conformation (PDB ID 5C97), C. Crystal structure with a linear peptide analogue (PDB ID 4z7i). The enzyme is found in a semi-closed conformation, D. Crystal structure with a macrocyclic peptide inhibitor (PDB ID 6YDX). The enzyme is found in a closed conformation upon binding of the inhibitor.

IRAP1 uses a catalytic mechanism like the one proposed for LTA4 hydrolase. It adopts a thermolysin-like fold and has been crystallized in two distinct conformations, an open and a closed one (Figure 1). IRAP is the only documented M1 aminopeptidase that can cleave cyclic peptides such as vasopressin and oxytocin. The distinct configuration of the GAMEN motif in IRAP generates additional space around residues 3 and 4 of the bound linear peptide, which could be used for the accommodation of bulkier side chains, possibly affording a broader selectivity for peptides. The atomic interactions between a ligand and IRAP can promote conformational closing. The open conformation is responsible for initial substrate capture, which can induce further closing that enhances interactions and facilitates catalysis. The IRAP/ligand-bound structure has significant differences compared to the "open" structure and IRAP/peptide structure. Domain IV was found juxtaposed against domains I/II, resulting in the full exclusion of the internal cavity from the external solvent. Recently, the crystal structure of IRAP with a macrocyclic peptide inhibitor was solved, identifying several key features of the inhibition mechanism. The close juxtaposition of the GAMEN loop on the bound inhibitor does not allow space for the motion of water molecules to interact with the ionized carboxylate of the active site residue Glu (Glu465). A synergy of two mechanisms, stabilization of closed conformation and exclusion of catalytic water by the tightly juxtaposed GAMEN loop was proposed as the mechanism of inhibition. Moreover, M1 aminopeptidases use a tyrosine residue in the active site to stabilize the transition state. In the case of IRAP, the catalytic Tyr549 is found in different orientations in the open and closed conformations. For example, in the case of phosphinic pseudopeptide inhibitors, which mimic the transition state of peptide substrates, Tyr549 changes orientation upon ligand binding to interact with one of the oxygen atoms of the phosphinic group, which is equivalent to the oxygen atoms of the substrate in the transition state.

=== Interactions ===
IRAP has been reported to interact through its cytoplasmic domain with various proteins involved in vesicular trafficking, organelle tethering, and cytoskeleton remodeling. These proteins include tankyrase-1, tankyrase-2, and p115, which regulate Golgi vesicle trafficking; vimentin, an intermediate cytoskeleton filament; and the actin remodeling protein FHOS. Furthermore, IRAP was found to associate with AS160/Tbc1d4, a Rab GTPase activating protein (GAP) specific for Rab8, 10, and 14. This suggests that IRAP plays a role in recruiting AS160 to endocytic membranes.

Apart from its association with intracellular trafficking proteins, IRAP has also been also observed to interact with proteins present in Glut4 storage vesicles (GSVs), such as sortilin, LRP1 and Glut4 in adipocytes. Under inflammatory conditions its role in GSV trafficking in adipocytes is regulated by the TNFa protein via glycosylation. Recently, its interaction with the z chain of the TCR (T-cell receptor) and the Lck kinase in T lymphocytes was discovered. In dendritic cells, IRAP-dependent vesicle trafficking and translocation to the phagocytic cup is regulated by immune receptors, such as TLR4 and FcgRs. Finally, IRAP has been proposed to interact with major histocompatibility complexes class-I (MHC-I) in specialized endosomes in DCs. There it exhibits roles in antigen cross-presentation.

== Therapeutic approaches and pharmacology ==
Therapeutic approaches for IRAP regulation rely on the development of peptidomimetics and small molecule inhibitors. The most explored classes of inhibitors for IRAP are the catalytic or the allosteric site ones.

=== IRAP catalytic site inhibitors ===
- Peptidomimetics

The first reported IRAP inhibitors were designed as angiotensin IV (AngIV) analogs. In 2006, Axén et al published a macrocyclized version of an AngIV derivative (Compound 1) which confers metabolic stability together with high affinity for IRAP (K_{i} = 25.8 nM). Under a similar scope Lukaszuk et al produced compound AL-11, which was able to inhibit IRAP (K_{i} = 27.5 nM) and displayed around 200-fold selectivity over APN. Further structural modifications on the AngIV-based inhibitors from Anderson et al led to optimized macrocycle HA08 (available crystal structure within IRAP, Figure 2) with excellent IRAP potency (K_{i} = 3.3 nM) and selectivity over APN, but poor metabolic stability.

- Benzopyrans

Benzopyran-based compounds were identified in a virtual screening against IRAP in 2008 and interact with the zinc cation of the catalytic site. All compounds showed specificity towards IRAP against the other aminopeptidases with a nanomolar affinity, while HFI-419 displayed the highest potency (Ki = 0.48 μM) and was also tested in in vivo bioassays of memory function.

- Phosphinic pseudopeptides

Although most of the phosphinic pseudopeptide analogs disclosed by Kokkala et al in 2016 were non-selective ERAP inhibitors, DG026 displayed a nanomolar affinity towards IRAP (IC_{50} = 32 nM) with improved selectivity.

- DABA derivatives

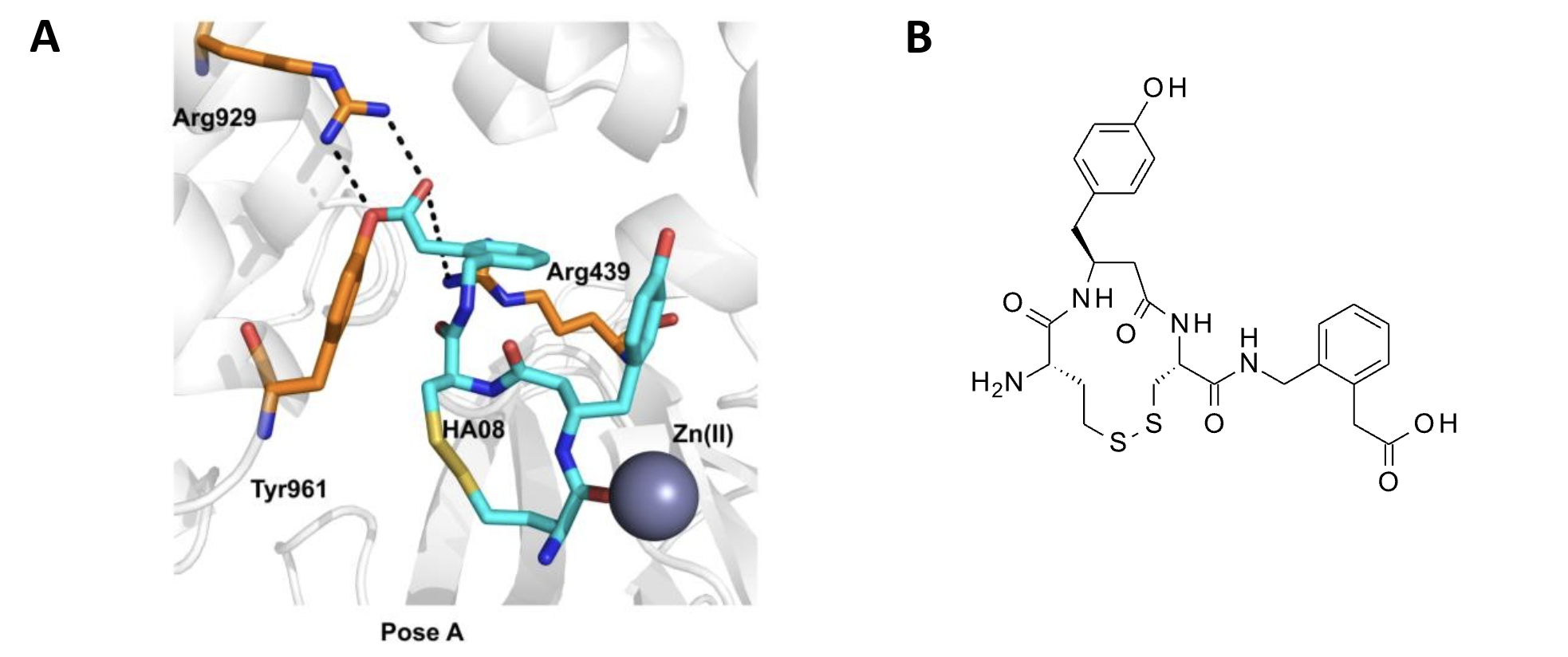
Figure 2. A. Crystal structure of IRAP co-crystallized with macrocycle HA08 in two binding poses. Adapted and recreated from PDB code 6YDX^{4}. B. 2D chemical structure of HA08. The dotted lines depict the interaction of the ligand's C-terminal with Arg 929.

A novel family of zinc-targeting diaminobenzoic acid (DABA) compounds were rationally designed bearing natural and unnatural aminoacid moieties, with micromolar potency for IRAP (compound 6, IC_{50} = 2.1 μM) and moderate selectivity over ERAP1 and ERAP2.

- Aryl sulfonamides

In 2014, Vanga et al recognized the ability of aryl sulfonamides to inhibit IRAP after screening a library of 10,500 drug-like compounds. After further optimization, compound 7 was developed displaying micromolar affinity towards IRAP (IC_{50} = 0.8 μM).

- α‐Hydroxy-β-amino Acid Derivatives

Selective low nanomolar inhibitors of IRAP based on the α‐Hydroxy-β-amino scaffold of the drug Ubenimex (Bestatin) have been described, showing excellent selectivity and strong cellular activity in blocking cross presentation.

=== IRAP allosteric site inhibitors ===
- Spiro-oxindole dihydroquinazolines

During a screening process in 2016, a spiro-oxindole dihydroquinazoline compound was identified as one of the most potent hits towards IRAP. This kind of compounds shows a high specificity for IRAP against APN (Compound 8 IC_{50} = 5.8 μM) and according to docking studies, the inhibitor acts in a binding pocket close to the GAMEN loop without interacting with the zing atom, leading to uncompetitive inhibition, confirmed later on by kinetic studies.

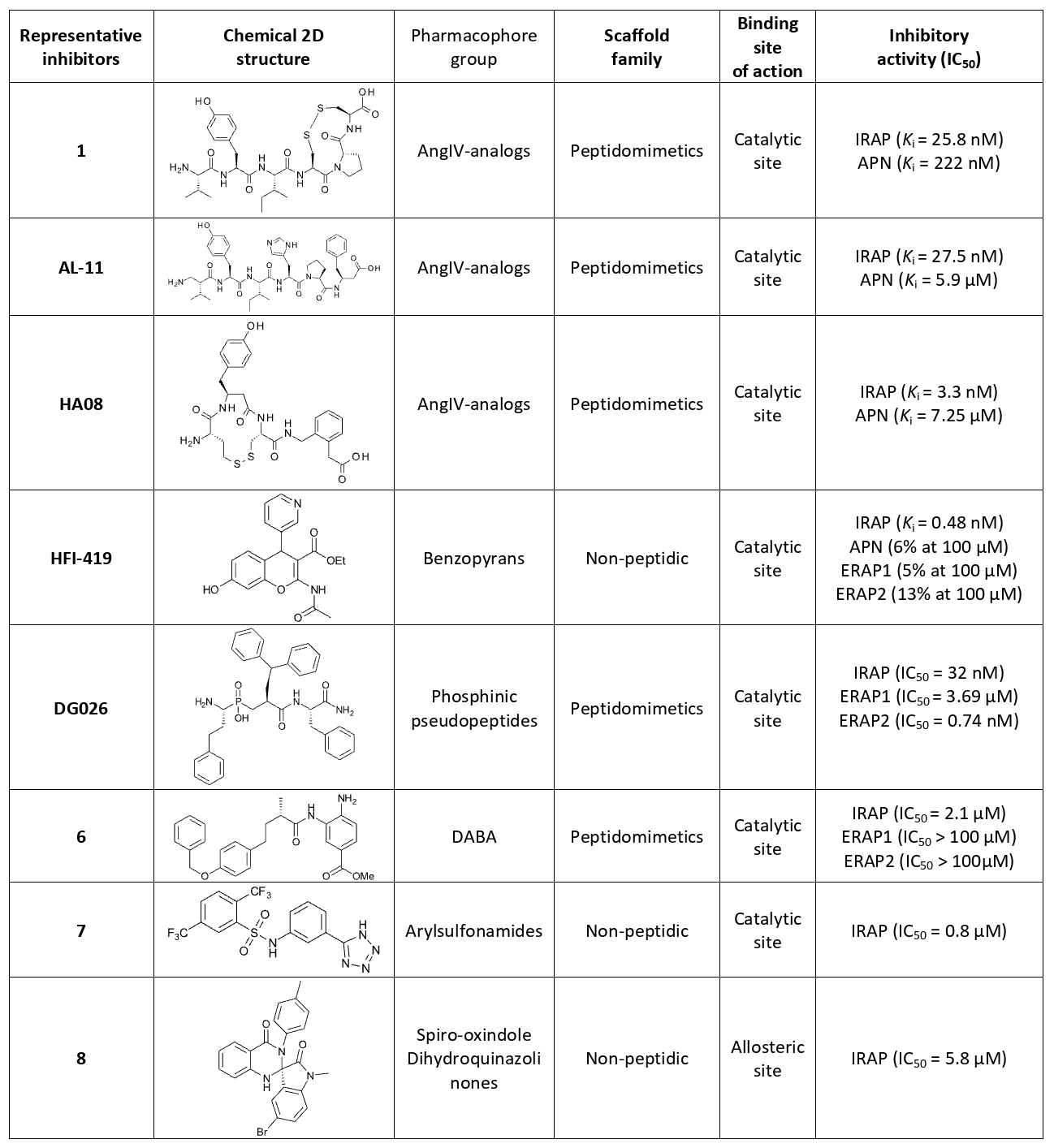
Table 1. Representative examples of reported IRAP inhibitors. IC_{50} value measured on long-peptide assay.
