= ERAP1 =

Protein-coding gene in the species Homo sapiens

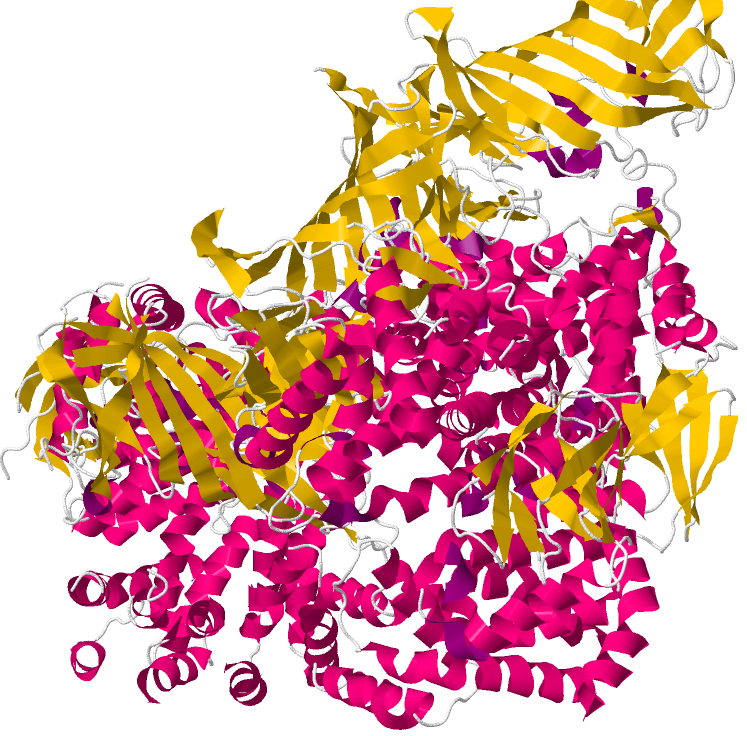

Identifiers
- Aliases: ERAP1, A-LAP, ALAP, APPILS, ARTS-1, ARTS1, ERAAP, ERAAP1, PILS-AP, PILSAP, endoplasmic reticulum aminopeptidase 1
- External IDs: OMIM: 606832; MGI: 1933403; GeneCards: ERAP1
Available structures
| PDB | Ortholog search: PDBe RCSB |
| PDB | List of PDB id codes 2YD0, 3MDJ, 3QNF, 3RJO |

Gene location (Human)
| Chr. | Chromosome 5 (human) |
| Band | 5q15 | Start | 96,760,810 bp |
| Band | 5q15 | End | 96,808,100 bp |

Gene location (Mouse)
| Chr. | Chromosome 13 (mouse) |
| Band | 13|13 C1 | Start | 74,787,687 bp |
| Band | 13|13 C1 | End | 74,841,320 bp |
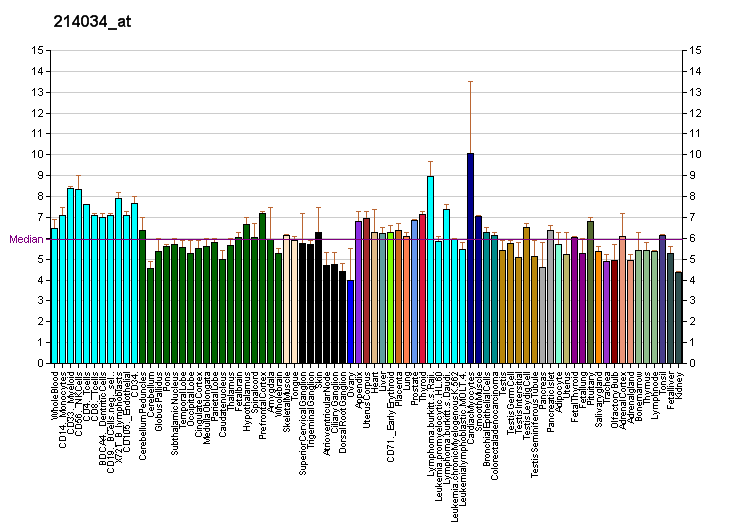

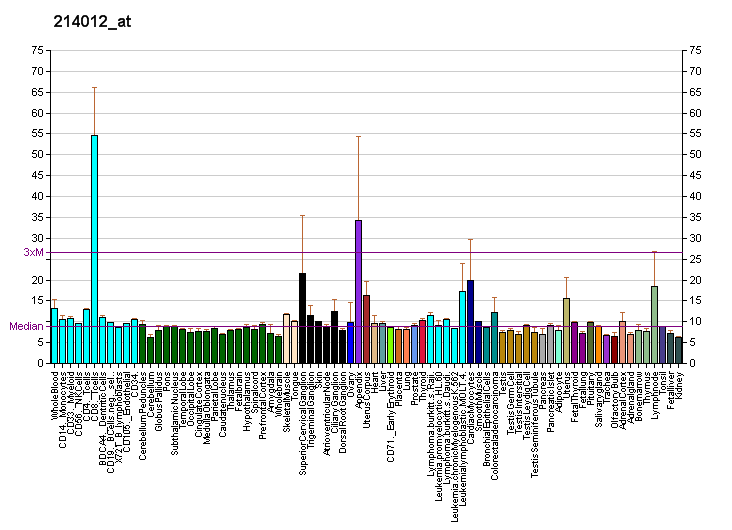
RNA expression pattern
| Bgee | Human / Mouse (ortholog); Top expressed in: jejunal mucosa; rectum; monocyte; epithelium of colon; duodenum; bone marrow cell; epithelium of nasopharynx; Achilles tendon; mucosa of colon; bronchial epithelial cell / Top expressed in: duodenum; muscle of thigh; jejunum; thymus; ileum; liver; tail of embryo; spleen; white adipose tissue; right kidney; More reference expression data |
| BioGPS | More reference expression data |
Gene ontology
| Molecular function | interleukin-6 receptor binding; peptide binding; zinc ion binding; metal ion binding; interleukin-1, type II receptor binding; peptidase activity; protein binding; aminopeptidase activity; metalloexopeptidase activity; hydrolase activity; metallopeptidase activity; endopeptidase activity; metalloaminopeptidase activity |
| Cellular component | cytoplasm; integral component of membrane; cytosol; endoplasmic reticulum membrane; membrane; extracellular region; endoplasmic reticulum; extracellular exosome; extracellular space; endoplasmic reticulum lumen; plasma membrane |
| Biological process | regulation of innate immune response; adaptive immune response; response to bacterium; immune system process; antigen processing and presentation of peptide antigen via MHC class I; proteolysis; positive regulation of angiogenesis; membrane protein ectodomain proteolysis; angiogenesis; fat cell differentiation; peptide catabolic process; antigen processing and presentation of endogenous peptide antigen via MHC class I; regulation of blood pressure; signal transduction; cell-cell signaling |
Sources:Amigo / QuickGO
Orthologs
| Databases | NCBI: entry; OMA: entry |
| Species | Human | Mouse |
| Entrez | 51752 | 80898 |
| Ensembl | ENSG00000164307 | ENSMUSG00000021583 |
| UniProt | Q9NZ08 | Q9EQH2 |
| RefSeq (mRNA) | NM_001040458; NM_001198541; NM_016442; NM_001349244 | NM_030711 |
| RefSeq (protein) | NP_001035548; NP_001185470; NP_057526; NP_001336173 | NP_109636 |
| Location (UCSC) | Chr 5: 96.76 – 96.81 Mb | Chr 13: 74.79 – 74.84 Mb |
| PubMed search |
- Wikidata
| View/Edit Human | View/Edit Mouse |

Endoplasmic reticulum aminopeptidase 1 (ERAP1) is an enzyme that in humans is encoded by the ERAP1 gene. This M1 zinc aminopeptidase is involved in the antigen processing and presentation pathway. ERAP1 is mainly located in the endoplasmic reticulum (ER), where it trims peptides at their N-terminus, adapting them for presentation by MHC class I molecules (MHC-I).

== Nomenclature ==
Historical names of ERAP1, [HUGO Gene Nomenclature Committee]:

- Aminopeptidase regulator of tumour necrosis factor receptor 1 (TNFR1) shedding (ARTS-1)
- Adipocyte-derived leucine aminopeptidase (A-LAP)
- Puromycin-insensitive leucyl-specific aminopeptidase (PILS-AP)
- KIAA0525
- In mice, ER aminopeptidase associated with antigen processing (ERAAP)

== Biology / Functions ==
Efficient presentation of antigenic peptides by MHC class I molecules provides the key signal for adaptive immune responses by cytotoxic (CD8^{+}) T lymphocytes. In the "endogenous" antigen presentation pathway, proteins synthesized by cells undergo cytosolic degradation and some of their peptide fragments are transported to the ER, where suitable-length peptides are loaded onto MHC class I molecules. In the ER, ERAP1 shortens longer peptides to the optimal length for stable binding onto MHC class I molecules (Figure 1). ERAP1, like other APP components, is induced by interferon gamma, a cytokine inducing antigen presentation. ERAP1 preferentially trims N-extended substrates of 9-16 residues to optimally sized 8-10 residue peptides. This "molecular ruler" mechanism is unique to ERAP1. ERAP1 also functions in the presentation of extracellular antigens in the cross-presentation pathway.

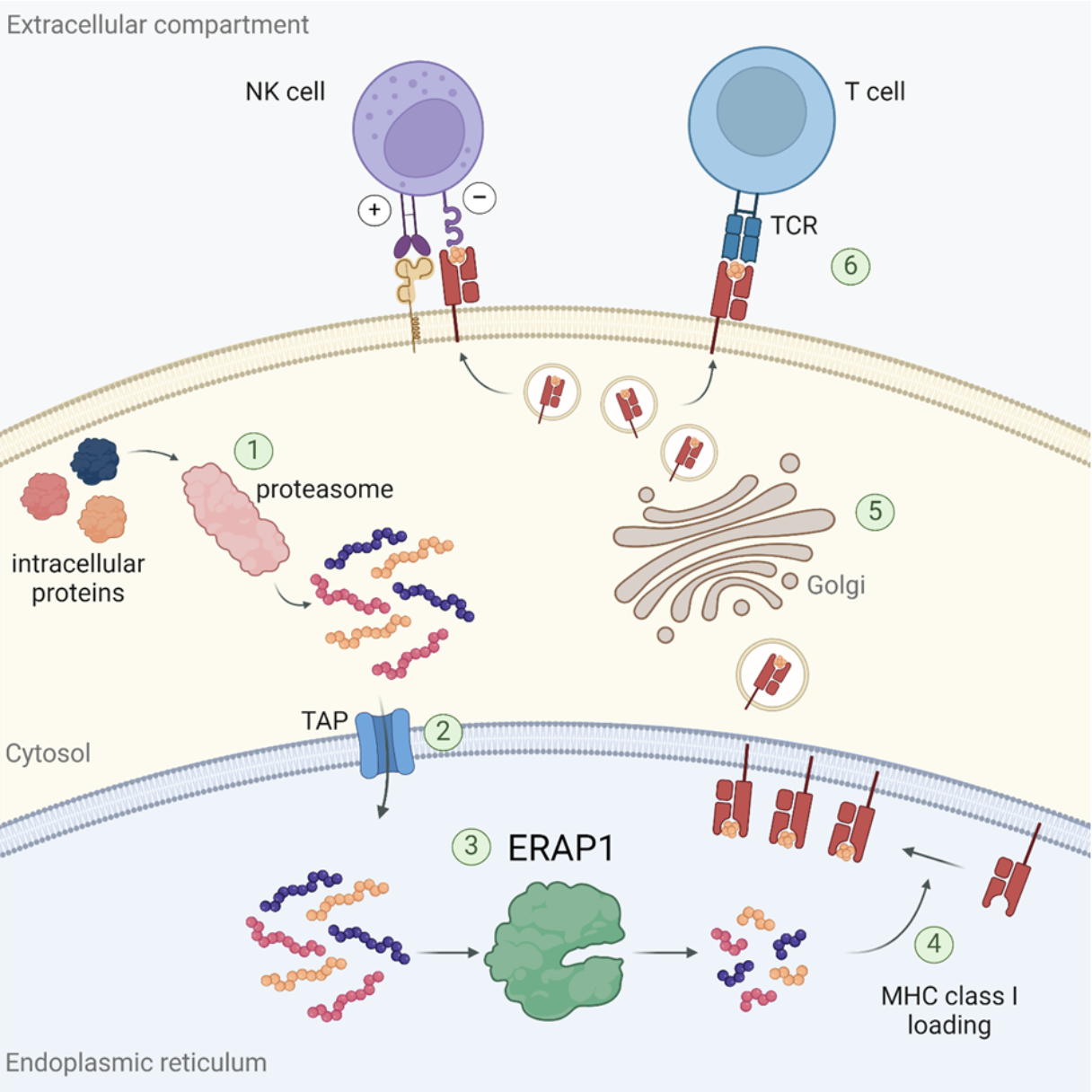
Figure 1. Scheme of ERAP1 role in antigen processing and presentation.

ERAP1 "trimming" modulates the peptide repertoire presented by MHC class I molecules and thereby shapes the adaptive immune response. In murine models, ERAAP (the murine homologue of human ERAP1) deficiency results in a strong alteration and increased immunogenicity of the peptide repertoire presented by MHC-I. Murine models with genetic deficiency for ERAAP have been instrumental for understanding the role of peptide trimming in the ER.

Besides peptide trimming in the ER, ERAP1 has been proposed to perform additional functions depending on its location. ERAP1 can be secreted into the extracellular space in response to inflammatory stimuli, which can lead to the activation of immune cells, such as macrophages or natural killer cells, and enhanced expression of pro-inflammatory cytokines.

== Genetics / Clinical significance ==
=== Gene / location ===
The ERAP1 gene (HGNC: 18173) is located at the long arm of chromosome 5 (5q15). The gene is ~47Kb in length and contains 20 exons and 19 introns, which encode 9 different splice variants. The coding sequence shows a high degree of conservation among placental mammals (>80% identity). The sequences of 227 ERAP1 orthologs identified in approximately 200 species are available.

=== SNPs ===
ERAP1 is a polymorphic gene that has many single nucleotide variants (SNVs) including several common missense variants that alter the ERAP1 amino acid sequence. The various combinations of common SNVs in ERAP1 organize into distinct haplotypes that encode different protein isoforms often referred to as "allotypes". The allotypes of ERAP1 can broadly be categorized based on their enzymatic activity ranging from "high" to "low". The enzymatic activity of ERAP1 is dependent on substrate recognition of the peptide, seen by the trimming efficiency of specific peptide substrates varying significantly for a given allotype. As is the case for allotype 10, a poor trimming allotype, shown to be tenfold less active compared to the ancestral allotype in hydrolysis of the substrate l-leucine-7-amido-4-methylcoumarin (Leu-AMC).

=== Disease association ===
Genetic variants and haplotypes (i.e., allotypes) of ERAP1 have been associated with a wide variety of inflammatory conditions, infectious diseases, and cancer. In particular, ERAP1 is a major risk gene identified in genome-wide association studies of MHC-I associated inflammatory conditions (or "MHC-I-opathies"), including Ankylosing Spondylitis, Bechet's disease, Birdshot Uveitis, and Psoriasis. In these conditions, ERAP1 is often in epistasis with the primary risk MHC-I allele. Other disease associations include insulin dependent Diabetes Mellitus and Multiple Sclerosis. Historically, ERAP1 gene associations were first reported in Hypertension. Emerging evidence links ERAP1 SNVs to cancer development, and susceptibility to infectious disease, such as ERAP1 SNVs that modify the resistance to influenza virus infection.

== Structure / Mechanism ==
=== Structure ===
Figure 2. Crystal structure of ERAP1 in (A) closed conformation (PDB ID code 2YD0) and (B) open conformation (PDB ID code 3MDJ).

ERAP1 belongs to the oxytocinase subfamily of the M1-family of zinc metalloproteases. It is composed of four structural domains. Domain I (residues 1–254) consists of an eight-stranded ß-sheet and provides binding sites for the N-terminus of substrates. It fits against the catalytic domain II and engages with domain IV through an elongated loop. Domain II (residues 255–529) is the thermolysin-like catalytic domain, composed by an alpha-helix and a five stranded beta sheet. This sheet comprises the specific for exopeptidases GAMEN motif which creates one part of the substrate binding-cleft. The catalytic Zn atom is coordinated by the residues His353, His357 and Glu386, found in the zinc-binding motif (H-E-X-X-H-X18-E) on the helix 6a. Domain III (residues 530–614) is composed by two beta-sheets forming a beta sandwich and acts as a linker between domains II and IV. Finally, domain IV (615–941) consists mainly of a-helices and exhibits a bowl-shaped form. At the closed (active) state, it juxtaposes with domain II forming a large internal cavity, which holds the C-term substrate binding site (Figure 2A). It is the most variable domain among this family of aminopeptidases.

=== Mechanism ===
ERAP1 uses a catalytic mechanism similar to the one proposed for LTA4 hydrolase. ERAP1 adopts a thermolysinlike fold and has been crystallized in two distinct conformations: a. the open and b. the closed (Figure 2). In the open conformation, domain IV lies away from the active site thus making the internal cavity more accessible to substrates. In the closed conformation, the internal cavity is occluded from the external solvent, and it is of adequate size to accommodate a 16-residue peptide. The catalytic residues and in particular Tyr438 are optimally positioned for catalysis in the closed conformation. Consequently, substrate binding is hypothesized to take place in the open conformation, while N-terminal bond cleavage takes place in the closed one. It has been proposed that binding of substrate or small inhibitors induces conformational closing of ERAP1 in solution.

ERAP1 prefers peptide substrates 9-16 amino acids long and is much less active for peptides 8-9 amino acids long. It is considered that ERAP1 uses a "molecular ruler" mechanism, according to which the substrate binds through its hydrophobic C-terminus in a hydrophobic pocket at the junction of domain III and domain IV and the N-terminus binds to the active site. When the length of the peptide is shorter than 8 or 9 amino acids, the peptide is too short to reach the active site, limiting rates of cleavage.

ERAP1 has a wide substrate specificity with a preference for hydrophobic residues (e.g. leucine and methionine) at the N-terminus of the peptide substrate. Tryptophan, arginine, cysteine and charged amino acids, like aspartic and glutamic acid, are poorly removed. ERAP1's trimming efficiency can also be influenced by the internal sequence of the peptide, with preferences for hydrophobic and positively charged residues.

=== Interactions ===
- ERp44

Hisatsune et al. demonstrated, by co-immunoprecipitation, an interaction between ERAP1 and the disulfide-shuffling chaperone ERp44, facilitated by disulfide bonds formed with cysteine residues in the exon 10 loop of ERAP1. This interaction was proposed to be the main mechanism for ER retention.

- Heterodimerization with ERAP2

Some experimental evidence has indicated the possibility of heterodimer formation between ERAP1 and ERAP2, another member of the oxytocinase sub-family of M1 aminopeptidases, that shares structural and functional similarities. The co-elution of ERAP1 and ERAP2 was detected through microsome fractionation, in the 230 kDa fraction, suggesting the formation of heterodimers. Proximity ligation assay analysis suggested a direct physical interaction between the two enzymes. A leucine zipper mediated ERAP1/ERAP2 complex exhibited enhanced trimming efficiency compared to a mixture of the two enzymes. Computational dynamics showed that ERAP1/ERAP2 heterodimerization could be mediated by the exon 10 loop, known to be involved in ERAP1-ERp44 interactions.

- MHC I proposed interaction

Chen et al. suggested that ERAP1 can trim N-terminally extended precursor antigenic peptides when bound onto MHC I. However, a re-evaluation of this trimming model by kinetic and biochemical analyses suggested that most MHC-I bound peptides had limited to no access to the active site of ERAP.

== Therapeutic approaches and pharmacology ==
Therapeutic approaches for ERAP1 regulation rely mostly on the development of small molecule inhibitors. The most explored classes of inhibitors for ERAP1 are the catalytic or the allosteric site ones.

Figure 3. 2D chemical structure of DG046.

=== ERAP1 catalytic site inhibitors ===
- Phosphinic derivatives

The first generation of ERAP1 inhibitors is a series of phosphinic pseudopeptides derived from a rational design approach targeting the catalytic zinc-binding site, in 2013^{1}. Notably, DG013A (Table 1, Figure 3) displayed high potency (ERAP1 IC_{50} = 33 nM) but poor selectivity against ERAP2 and IRAP, with reported SAR optimization studies demonstrating the importance of side chains at positions P_{1}' and P_{2}'. A high-resolution crystal structure of phosphinic analogue DG046 bound in the active site of ERAP1, has been obtained (Figure 4).

- DABA analogues

A novel family of zinc-targeting diaminobenzoic acid (DABA) compounds were rationally designed and developed in 2013, displaying micromolar potency for ERAP1 inhibition (compound 2, IC_{50} = 2 μM, Table 1). Moderate selectivity over ERAP2 and IRAP with additional optimization efforts based on extensive investigation of SAR has been achieved.

- Urea derivatives

Figure 4. Crystal structure of ERAP1 co-crystallized with DG046.

In 2020, urea derivative 3 (Table 1) was identified via high-throughput screening (HTS), as a competitive inhibitor of ERAP1 aminopeptidase activity (IC_{50} = 6.9 μM) with increased selectivity over ERAP2 and IRAP. SAR exploration and docking studies showed that the N-acetylpiperazine carbonyl group was critical for the activity via its zinc-binding group properties.

=== ERAP1 allosteric site inhibitors ===
- Compound GSK235

Methyl (3R,4R)-1-(3-cyano-4-methyl-6-((4-methyltetrahydro-2H-pyran-4-yl)amino)pyridin-2-yl)-4-isopropylpyrrolidine-3-carboxylate was reported to be a potent, selective and orally available inhibitor of ERAP1. In vivo experiments showed efficacy in tumor growth control in a mouse model as well as therapeutic benefit in an inflammatory autoimmunity murine model. This compound ("GSK235") is a potent in vivo tool for exploring ERAP1 biology and possible therapeutic applications.

- Cyclohexyl acids

Optimization of a library screening hit has led to the identification of cyclohexyl acids with excellent potency (pIC50 = 8.6), cellular activity (pIC50 = 7.7) and moderate unbound clearance and oral bioavailability highlighting the promise of this series as drug leads.

- Clerodane acid

A high-throughput library screen identified Clerodane acid, a natural product from Dodonaea viscosa, to be a selective activator of ERAP1 for small substrates and an inhibitor of peptide trimming. This compound was found active in blocking ERAP1-dependent antigen presentation (EC50 = 1μΜ) and to bind to the regulatory site of ERAP1 that normally accommodates C-termini of peptide substates. Clerodane acid was also found to induce strong immunopeptidome shifts in cancer cells.

- Benzofurans

This family of compounds were identified as potential allosteric (C-terminus recognition site of peptides) inhibitor via fluorescence-based high-throughput screening in 2021. Compound 4 (Table 1) displayed high potency (ERAP1 IC_{50} = 34 nM) and at the same time selectivity against ERAP2 and IRAP.

- Sulfonamides

Sulfonamide compound 5 (Table 1) was identified through high-throughput screening studies as a potential allosteric selective inhibitor, binding at the interface between domain II and IV of ERAP1. It activates small peptide hydrolysis but effectively inhibits processing of long peptides with 8−13 residues (IC_{50} = 5.3 μM) and displays selectivity over ERAP2 and IRAP.

=== Clinical trials ===
As of 2023, an ERAP1 Inhibitor (GRWD5769) developed by Grey Wolf Therapeutics has entered phase I/II. Its safety, tolerability, efficacy, and pharmacokinetics are being evaluated in patients with viral associated solid tumours (head and neck squamous cell carcinoma, cervical cancer, and hepatocellular carcinoma) that are particularly sensitive to ERAP1 inhibition, as monotherapy, or in combination with PD-1 immune checkpoint Inhibitor Libtayo^{®} (cemiplimab).

Table 1. Representative examples of ERAP1 inhibitors. IC_{50} value measured on long-peptide assay.
