= RAB14 =

Protein-coding gene in the species Homo sapiens

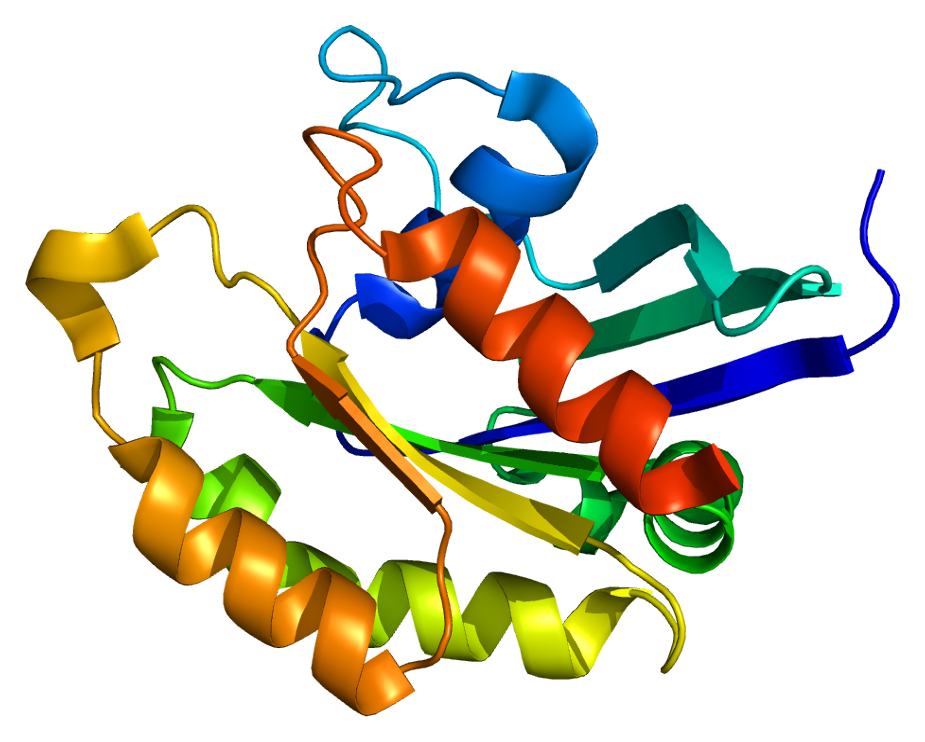

Identifiers
- Aliases: RAB14, FBP, RAB-14, member RAS oncogene family
- External IDs: OMIM: 612673; MGI: 1915615; GeneCards: RAB14
Available structures
PDB	Ortholog search: PDBe RCSB
PDB	List of PDB id codes 1Z0F, 4D0G, 4DRZ
Enzyme activity
EC #	BRENDA	ExPASy	KEGG	MetaCyc
3.6.5.2	↗	↗	↗	↗

Gene location (Human)
Chr.	Chromosome 9 (human)
Band	9q33.2	Start	121,178,133 bp
Band	9q33.2	End	121,223,014 bp

Gene location (Mouse)
Chr.	Chromosome 2 (mouse)
Band	2|2 B	Start	35,070,217 bp
Band	2|2 B	End	35,091,132 bp
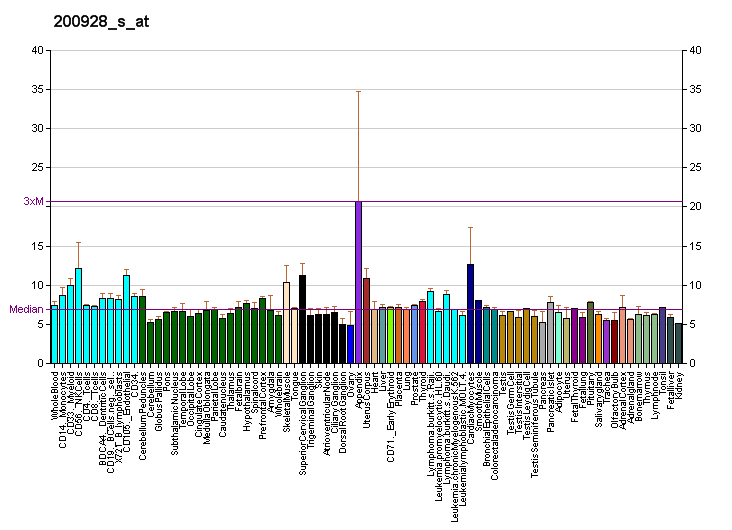

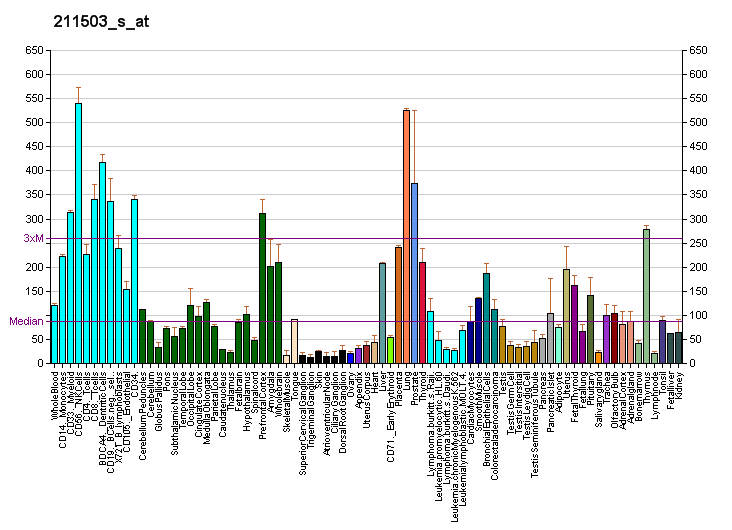

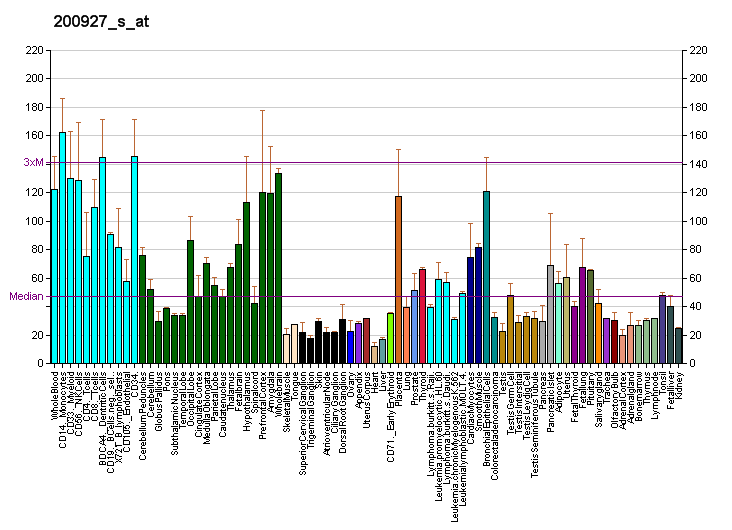
RNA expression pattern
Bgee	Human / Mouse (ortholog); Top expressed in: nipple; inferior ganglion of vagus nerve; lactiferous duct; mucosa of paranasal sinus; lower lobe of lung; mucosa of pharynx; ventral tegmental area; optic nerve; frontal pole; superior vestibular nucleus / Top expressed in: Epithelium of choroid plexus; ciliary body; conjunctival fornix; fossa; iris; retinal pigment epithelium; vestibular membrane of cochlear duct; condyle; vestibular sensory epithelium; urothelium; More reference expression data
BioGPS	More reference expression data
Gene ontology
Molecular function	nucleotide binding; GDP binding; GTP binding; myosin V binding; protein binding; GTPase activity
Cellular component	recycling endosome; endosome; late endosome; rough endoplasmic reticulum; nuclear outer membrane-endoplasmic reticulum membrane network; intracellular membrane-bounded organelle; membrane; Golgi membrane; intracellular anatomical structure; lysosomal membrane; trans-Golgi network; phagocytic vesicle; perinuclear region of cytoplasm; Golgi stack; trans-Golgi network transport vesicle; lysosome; extracellular exosome; cytoplasmic vesicle; cytosol; plasma membrane; cilium; early endosome membrane; recycling endosome membrane; tertiary granule membrane; early endosome; Golgi apparatus
Biological process	embryo development; Golgi to endosome transport; intracellular transport; fibroblast growth factor receptor signaling pathway; phagosome maturation; defense response to bacterium; endocytic recycling; protein transport; vesicle-mediated transport; regulation of protein localization; phosphatidylinositol biosynthetic process; neutrophil degranulation; regulation of endocytosis; transport; intracellular protein transport; Rab protein signal transduction; regulation of embryonic development; phagolysosome assembly involved in apoptotic cell clearance
Sources:Amigo / QuickGO
Orthologs
Databases	NCBI: entry; OMA: entry
Species	Human	Mouse
Entrez	51552	68365
Ensembl	ENSG00000119396	ENSMUSG00000026878
UniProt	P61106	Q91V41
RefSeq (mRNA)	NM_016322	NM_026697
RefSeq (protein)	NP_057406	NP_080973
Location (UCSC)	Chr 9: 121.18 – 121.22 Mb	Chr 2: 35.07 – 35.09 Mb
PubMed search
- Wikidata
View/Edit Human	View/Edit Mouse

Ras-related protein Rab-14 is a protein that in humans is encoded by the RAB14 gene.
