= Addiction vulnerability =

Range of genetic and environmental risk factors for developing an addiction

Addiction and dependence glossary
- addiction – a neuropsychological disorder characterized by a persistent and intense urge to use a drug or engage in a behavior that produces natural reward; addictive drug – psychoactive substances that with repeated use are associated with significantly higher rates of substance use disorders, due in large part to the drug's effect on brain reward systems; dependence – an adaptive state associated with a withdrawal syndrome upon cessation of repeated exposure to a stimulus (e.g., drug intake); drug sensitization or reverse tolerance – the escalating effect of a drug resulting from repeated administration at a given dose; drug withdrawal – symptoms that occur upon cessation of repeated drug use; physical dependence – dependence that involves persistent physical–somatic withdrawal symptoms (e.g., delirium tremens and nausea); psychological dependence – dependence that is characterized by emotional-motivational withdrawal symptoms (e.g., anhedonia and anxiety) that affect cognitive functioning.; reinforcing stimuli – stimuli that increase the probability of repeating behaviors paired with them; rewarding stimuli – stimuli that the brain interprets as intrinsically positive and desirable or as something to approach; sensitization – an amplified response to a stimulus resulting from repeated exposure to it; substance use disorder – a condition in which the use of substances leads to clinically and functionally significant impairment or distress; drug tolerance – the diminishing effect of a drug resulting from repeated administration at a given dose

Addiction vulnerability is an individual's risk of developing an addiction during their lifetime. There are a range of genetic and environmental risk factors for developing an addiction that vary across the population. Genetic and environmental risk factors each account for roughly half of an individual's risk for developing an addiction; the contribution from epigenetic (inheritable traits) risk factors to the total risk is unknown. Even in individuals with a relatively low genetic risk, exposure to sufficiently high doses of an addictive drug for a long period of time (e.g., weeks–months) can result in an addiction. In other words, anyone can become an individual with a substance use disorder under particular circumstances. Research is working toward establishing a comprehensive picture of the neurobiology of addiction vulnerability, including all factors at work in propensity for addiction.

== Three-factor model ==
Accepted research now shows that some people have vulnerabilities to addiction and has established a three-factor standard for vulnerability to drug addiction: genetic factors, environmental factors, and repeated exposure to drugs of use. Being vulnerable to addiction means there is a factor that makes one individual more likely to develop an addiction than another individual. Additionally, many in the science community agree that addiction is not simply just a result of desensitized neural receptors but also a corollary of long-term associated memories (or cues) of substance use and self-administration. Vulnerability to addiction has both physiological and biological components.

=== Genetic factors ===
Contemporary research in neurobiology (a branch of science that deals with the anatomy, physiology, and pathology of nervous system) of addiction points to genetics as a major contributing factor to addiction vulnerability. It has been estimated that 40–60% of the vulnerability to developing an addiction is due to genetics. One gene in particular, the D_{2} subtype of dopamine receptor, has been studied at length in association to substance addiction. The D_{2} receptor responds to the chemical dopamine which produces rewarding and pleasurable feelings in the brain. Through mice studies, agreeing contemporary research has shown that individuals with a deficiency in this dopamine receptor exhibit not only a preference for and increased consumption of alcohol over their genetically normal peers, but also compensated levels of the cannabinoid receptor type CB_{1}.

This suggests that both of these genetic factors work together in the regulation of alcohol and cocaine in the brain and in the normal regulation of dopamine. Individuals with this genetic deficiency in the D_{2} dopamine receptor may be more likely to seek out these recreational pleasure/reward producing substances as they are less receptive to the natural “feel good’’ effects of dopamine. This naturally occurring deficiency is one of the most studied genetic vulnerabilities to substance abuse across the field. Recent studies show that GABA also plays a role in vulnerability to addiction. When alcohol is consumed it affects GABA by mimicking its effects on the brain, such as basic motor functions.

Additionally, genetics play a role on individual traits, which may put one at increased risk for experimentation with drugs, continued use of drugs, addictions, and potential for relapse. Some of these individual personality traits, such as impulsivity, reward-seeking, and response to stress, may lead to increased vulnerability to addiction.

=== Environmental factors ===
A major environmental factor that increases vulnerability to developing addiction is availability of drugs. Additionally, socioeconomic status and poor familial relationships have been shown to be contributing factors in the initiation and continued use of alcohol or other drugs. Neurobiology plays a role in addiction vulnerability when in combination with environmental factors. Chronic stressors contribute to vulnerability because they can put the brain in a compromised state. External stressors (such as financial concerns and family problems) can, after repeated exposure, affect the physiology of the brain.

Chronic stress or trauma has been shown to have neuroadaptive effects. The brain can physically “rewire” itself to accommodate for the increase in cortisol produced by the stressors. Evidence has also shown that a great amount of stress hinders prefrontal functioning and causes an increased limbic-striatal level response. This can lead to low behavioral and cognitive control. Additionally, when the brain is put under severe stress due to repeated drug use, it has been shown to be physiologically altered. This compromised neural state plays a large role in perpetuating addiction and in making recovery more difficult.

=== Repeated exposure ===
Repeated exposure to a drug is one of the determining factors in distinguishing recreational substance use from chronic abuse. Many neurobiological theories of addiction place repeated or continued use of the drug in the path of addiction development. For example, researchers have theorized that addiction is the result of the shift from goal-directed actions to habits and ultimately, to compulsive drug-seeking and taking.

In other words, repeated, deliberate use of the drug plays a role in the eventual compulsory drug-taking and/or habitual drug-taking associated with addiction. Another theory suggests that through repeated use of the drug, individuals become sensitized to drug-associated stimuli which may result in compulsive motivation and desire for the drug.

Additionally, a third neurobiological theory highlights the changes in brain reward circuitry following repeated drug use that contributes to the development of addiction such that addiction is conceptualized as being a progression of allostatic changes in which the addicted individual is able to maintain stability but at a pathological set point. Experience-dependent neural plasticity is a hallmark of repeated drug exposure and refers to the adaptation of the brain due to increased levels of the drug in the body. In this sense, repeated exposure falls under both physiological vulnerability and behavioral/psychological vulnerability to addiction.

Although many variables individually contribute to an increased risk of developing a substance use disorder, no single vulnerability guarantees the development of addiction. It is the combination of many factors (e.g. genetics, environmental stressors, initiation and continued use of the drug) that culminates in the development of this disorder.

=== Adolescence ===
Previous research has examined the increased risk of early-onset substance use during adolescence. Many factors have been identified as being associated with increased risk of substance use during this period of development including individual differences (e.g., negative affect, decreased harm avoidance, and low motivation for achievement), biological (e.g., genetic predisposition and neurological development), and environmental factors (e.g., high levels of stress, peer influences, availability of substances, etc.) Rat studies provide behavioral evidence that adolescence is a period of increased vulnerability to drug-seeking behavior and onset addiction.

The mesolimbic dopamine system of the brain undergoes reorganization and functional changes during adolescence. Rat studies have shown that adolescents have tendencies and abilities to drink more than adults due to minimal disruption to their motor functions and minimal sensitivity to sedation. As a result, adolescents are more susceptible to developing substance used disorders. The social, behavioral, and developmental factors in adolescents encourage drug seeking behavior, and as a result, addiction.

=== Epigenetic factors ===
==== Transgenerational epigenetic inheritance ====
Epigenetic genes and their products (e.g., proteins) are the key components through which environmental influences can affect the genes of an individual; they also serve as the mechanism responsible for transgenerational epigenetic inheritance, a phenomenon in which environmental influences on the genes of a parent can affect the associated traits and behavioral phenotypes of their offspring (e.g., behavioral responses to environmental stimuli). In addiction, epigenetic mechanisms play a central role in the pathophysiology of the disease; it has been noted that some of the alterations to the epigenome which arise through chronic exposure to addictive stimuli during an addiction can be transmitted across generations, in turn affecting the behavior of one's children (e.g., the child's behavioral responses to addictive drugs and natural rewards).

The general classes of epigenetic alterations that have been implicated in transgenerational epigenetic inheritance include DNA methylation, histone modifications, and downregulation or upregulation of microRNAs. With respect to addiction, more research is needed to determine the specific heritable epigenetic alterations that arise from various forms of addiction in humans and the corresponding behavioral phenotypes from these epigenetic alterations that occur in human offspring. Based upon preclinical evidence from animal research, certain addiction-induced epigenetic alterations in rats can be transmitted from parent to offspring and produce behavioral phenotypes that decrease the offspring's risk of developing an addiction. (Note: According to a review of experimental animal models that examined the transgenerational epigenetic inheritance of epigenetic marks that occur in addiction, alterations in histone acetylation – specifically, di-acetylation of lysine residues 9 and 14 on histone 3 (i.e., H3K9ac2 and H3K14ac2) in association with BDNF gene promoters – have been shown to occur within the medial prefrontal cortex (mPFC), testes, and sperm of cocaine-addicted male rats. These epigenetic alterations in the rat mPFC result in increased BDNF gene expression within the mPFC, which in turn blunts the rewarding properties of cocaine and reduces cocaine self-administration. The male but not female offspring of these cocaine-exposed rats inherited both epigenetic marks (i.e., di-acetylation of lysine residues 9 and 14 on histone 3) within mPFC neurons, the corresponding increase in BDNF expression within mPFC neurons, and the behavioral phenotype associated with these effects (i.e., a reduction in cocaine reward, resulting in reduced cocaine-seeking by these male offspring). Consequently, the transmission of these two cocaine-induced epigenetic alterations (i.e., H3K9ac2 and H3K14ac2) in rats from male fathers to male offspring served to reduce the offspring's risk of developing an addiction to cocaine. As of 2018, neither the heritability of these epigenetic marks in humans nor the behavioral effects of the marks within human mPFC neurons has been established.) More generally, the heritable behavioral phenotypes that are derived from addiction-induced epigenetic alterations and transmitted from parent to offspring may serve to either increase or decrease the offspring's risk of developing an addiction.
