= Streptomyces abikoensis =

Scientific classification
- Domain: Bacteria
- Kingdom: Bacillati
- Phylum: Actinomycetota
- Class: Actinomycetes
- Order: Streptomycetales
- Family: Streptomycetaceae
- Genus: Streptomyces
- Species: S. abikoensis

Binomial name
- Streptomyces abikoensis (Umezawa et al. 1951) Witt and Stackebrandt 1991

Type strain
- AS 4.1162, AS-803, ATCC 12766, BCRC 12461, CBS 487.62, CCRC 12461, CGMCC 4.1662, CIP 108146, DSM 40831, ETH 24334, ETH 28585, IAM 1, IFM 1034, IFO 13860, IMC S-0593, IMRU 3654, IPV 1962, IPV 2027, JCM 4002, KCC S-0002, KCCM 40196, KCTC 9662, KCTC 9741, KKNI 9092, NBIMCC 1606, NBRC 13860, NCB 260, NI 9092, NIHJ Z-1-6, NRRL B-1518, NRRL B-2113, PCM 2364, PSA 225, RIA 479, RIA 497, Z-1-6

Synonyms
- "Streptomyces abokobensis" Umezawa et al. 1951; "Streptomyces ehimensis" Shibata et al. 1954; Streptomyces ehimensis corrig. (Shibata et al. 1954) Witt and Stackebrandt 1991; Streptomyces ekimensis (Shibata et al. 1954) Witt and Stackebrandt 1991; "Streptomyces luteoverticillatus" Shinobu 1956; Streptomyces luteoverticillatus (Shinobu 1956) Witt and Stackebrandt 1991; "Streptomyces olivoreticuli" Arai et al. 1957; Streptomyces olivoreticuli (Arai et al. 1957) Witt and Stackebrandt 1991; Streptomyces parvisporogenes (Locci et al. 1969) Witt and Stackebrandt 1991; Streptoverticillium abikoense (Umezawa et al. 1951) Locci et al. 1969 (Approved Lists 1980); Streptoverticillium ehimense (Shibata et al. 1954) Locci et al. 1969 (Approved Lists 1980); Streptoverticillium luteoverticillatum (Shinobu 1956) Locci et al. 1969 (Approved Lists 1980); Streptoverticillium olivoreticuli corrig. (Arai et al. 1957) Baldacci et al. 1966 (Approved Lists 1980); Streptoverticillium olivoreticuli subsp. cellulophilum corrig. (ex Anonymous 1973) Locci and Schofield 1989; Streptoverticillium olivoreticulum (Arai et al. 1957) Baldacci et al. 1966 (Approved Lists 1980); Streptoverticillium olivoreticulum subsp. cellulophilum (ex Anonymous 1973) Locci and Schofield 1989; Streptoverticillium parvisporogenes corrig. Locci et al. 1969 (Approved Lists 1980); Streptoverticillium parvisporogenum Locci et al. 1969 (Approved Lists 1980); "Verticillomyces abikobensis" (Umezawa et al. 1951) Shinobu 1965

Species of bacterium

Streptomyces abikoensis is a bacterium species from the genus Streptomyces which produces the antibiotic abikoviromycin. Streptomyces abikoensis has been isolated from Abiko in Japan.

== See also ==
- List of Streptomyces species
