= Aminopeptidase B =

Class of enzymes

Identifiers
- EC no.: 3.4.11.6
- CAS no.: 9073-92-1

Databases
- IntEnz: IntEnz view
- BRENDA: BRENDA entry
- ExPASy: NiceZyme view
- KEGG: KEGG entry
- MetaCyc: metabolic pathway
- PRIAM: profile
- PDB structures: RCSB PDB PDBe PDBsum
Search
- PMC: articles
- PubMed: articles
- NCBI: proteins

Aminopeptidase B (EC 3.4.11.6, arylamidase II, arginine aminopeptidase, arginyl aminopeptidase, Cl—activated arginine aminopeptidase, cytosol aminopeptidase IV, L-arginine aminopeptidase) is an enzyme. This enzyme catalyses the following chemical reaction

Release of N-terminal Arg and Lys from oligopeptides when P1' is not Pro. Also acts on arylamides of Arg and Lys

This enzyme from mammalian tissues is activated by chloride ions and low concentrations of thiol compounds.

An inhibitor is bestatin (ubenimex).
