= Abikoviromycin =

Names
- IUPAC name (1S,3R,10Z)-10-ethylidene-2-oxa-6-azatricyclo[5.3.0.01,3]deca-6,8-diene
- Other names Latumcidin

Identifiers
CAS Number	31774-33-1
3D model (JSmol)	Interactive image
ChemSpider	16735636
PubChem CID	6450263
UNII	V639MO1IZ5
CompTox Dashboard (EPA)	DTXSID501043393
- InChI: InChI=1S/C10H11NO/c1-2-7-3-4-8-10(7)9(12-10)5-6-11-8/h2-4,9H,5-6H2,1H3/b7-2-/t9-,10+/m1/s1 Key: KQSFHAWSULOGRI-LPPIIHRRSA-N
- SMILES: CC=C1C=CC2=NCCC3C12O3

Properties
Chemical formula	C_{10}H_{11}NO
Molar mass	161.204 g·mol^{−1}

Hazards
- Lethal dose or concentration (LD, LC)
LD_{50} (median dose)	7 mg/kg (IV, mice)
- Except where otherwise noted, data are given for materials in their standard state (at 25 °C [77 °F], 100 kPa). Infobox references

Abikoviromycin is an antiviral antibiotic piperidine alkaloid with the molecular formula C_{10}H_{11}NO. It is produced by the bacteria Streptomyces abikoensis and Streptomyces rubescens. It was discovered at National Institutes of Health in Japan (now called the National Institute of Infectious Diseases) and first reported in the Japanese Medical Journal in 1951 in a paper authored by researchers Hamao Umezawa, Tadakatu Tazaki, and Setsuko Fukuyama.
