= Bacterial leucyl aminopeptidase =

Class of enzymes

Identifiers
- EC no.: 3.4.11.10
- CAS no.: 37288-67-8

Databases
- IntEnz: IntEnz view
- BRENDA: BRENDA entry
- ExPASy: NiceZyme view
- KEGG: KEGG entry
- MetaCyc: metabolic pathway
- PRIAM: profile
- PDB structures: RCSB PDB PDBe PDBsum
Search
- PMC: articles
- PubMed: articles
- NCBI: proteins

Bacterial leucyl aminopeptidase (EC 3.4.11.10, Aeromonas proteolytica aminopeptidase) is an enzyme. This enzyme catalyses the following chemical reaction

Release of an N-terminal amino acid, preferentially leucine, but not glutamic or aspartic acids

This is a zinc enzyme.
