= Aspartic protease =

Eukaryotic aspartyl protease
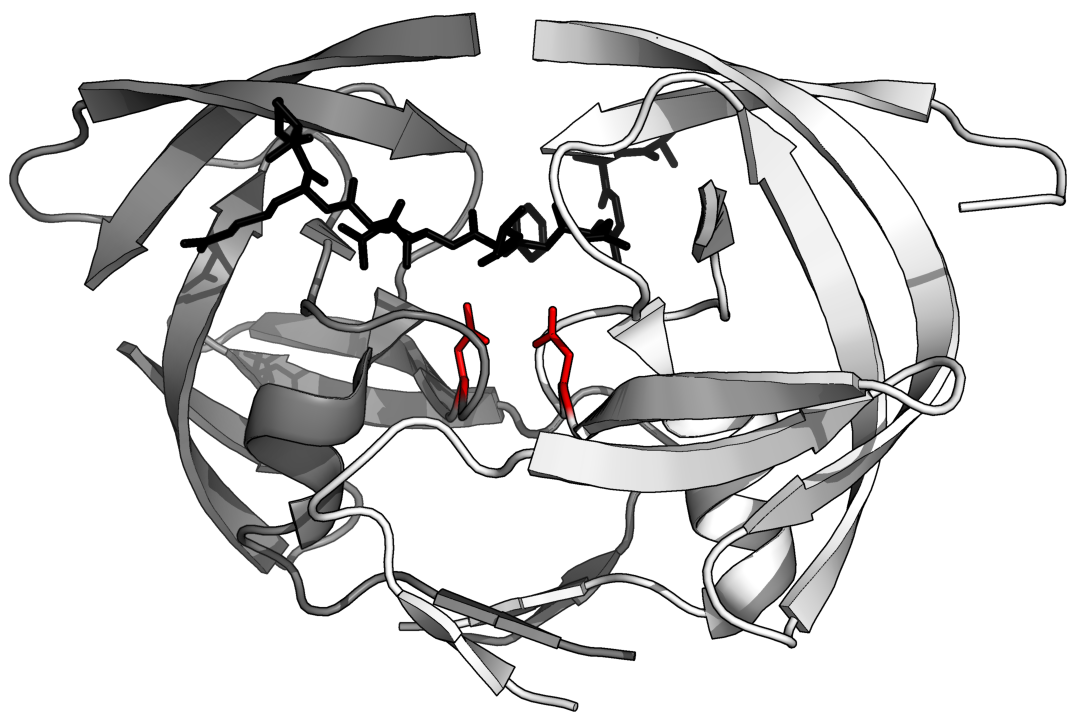
- Structure of the dimeric aspartic protease HIV protease in white and grey, with peptide substrate in black and active site aspartate side chains in red. (PDB: 1KJF)

Identifiers
- Symbol: Asp
- Pfam: PF00026
- InterPro: IPR001461
- PROSITE: PDOC00128
- SCOP2: 1mpp / SCOPe / SUPFAM
- OPM superfamily: 100
- OPM protein: 1lyb
- Membranome: 315
Available protein structures:
- PDB: IPR001461 PF00026 (ECOD; PDBsum)
- AlphaFold: IPR001461; PF00026

Aspartic proteases (also "aspartyl proteases", "aspartic endopeptidases") are a catalytic type of protease enzymes that use an activated water molecule bound to one or more aspartate residues for catalysis of their peptide substrates. In general, they have two highly conserved aspartates in the active site and are optimally active at acidic pH. Nearly all known aspartyl proteases are inhibited by pepstatin.

Aspartic endopeptidases EC 3.4.23. of vertebrate, fungal and retroviral origin have been characterised. More recently, aspartic endopeptidases associated with the processing of bacterial type 4 prepilin and archaean preflagellin have been described.

Eukaryotic aspartic proteases include pepsins, cathepsins, and renins. They have a two-domain structure, arising from ancestral duplication. Retroviral and retrotransposon proteases (retroviral aspartyl proteases) are much smaller and appear to be homologous to a single domain of the eukaryotic aspartyl proteases. Each domain contributes a catalytic Asp residue, with an extended active site cleft localized between the two lobes of the molecule. One lobe has probably evolved from the other through a gene duplication event in the distant past. In modern-day enzymes, although the three-dimensional structures are very similar, the amino acid sequences are more divergent, except for the catalytic site motif, which is very conserved. The presence and position of disulfide bridges are other conserved features of aspartic peptidases.

== Catalytic mechanism ==
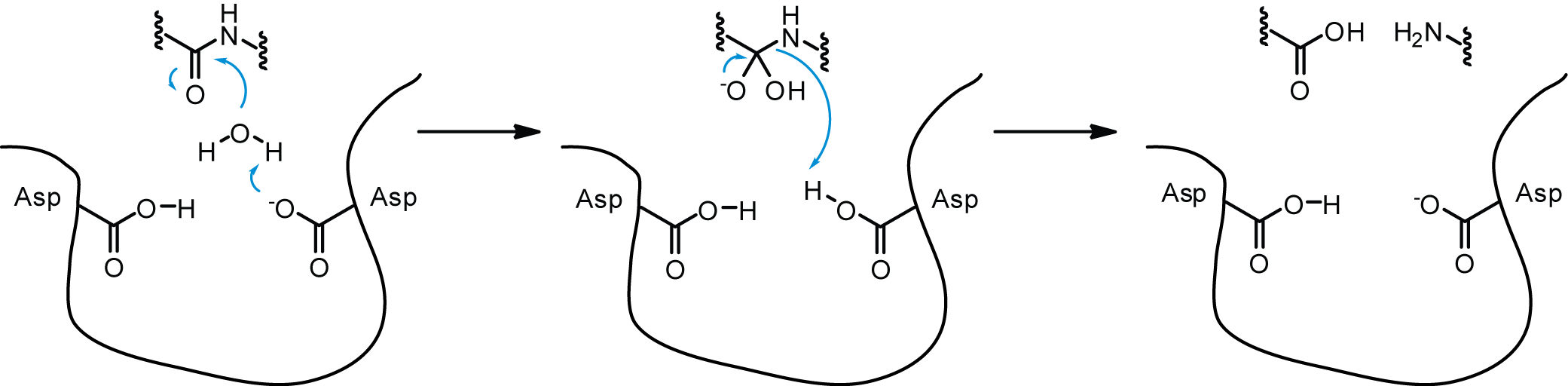
Proposed mechanism of peptide cleavage by aspartyl proteases.

Aspartyl proteases are a highly specific family of proteases – they tend to cleave dipeptide bonds that have hydrophobic residues as well as a beta-methylene group. Unlike serine or cysteine proteases these proteases do not form a covalent intermediate during cleavage. Proteolysis therefore occurs in a single step.

While a number of different mechanisms for aspartyl proteases have been proposed, the most widely accepted is a general acid-base mechanism involving coordination of a water molecule between the two highly conserved aspartate residues. One aspartate activates the water by abstracting a proton, enabling the water to perform a nucleophilic attack on the carbonyl carbon of the substrate scissile bond, generating a tetrahedral oxyanion intermediate stabilized by hydrogen-bonding with the second aspartic acid. Rearrangement of this intermediate leads to protonation of the scissile amide which results in the splitting of the substrate peptide into two product peptides.

== Inhibition ==
Pepstatin is an inhibitor of aspartate proteases.

== Classification ==
Five superfamilies (clans) of aspartic proteases are known, each representing an independent evolution of the same active site and mechanisms. Each superfamily contains several families with similar sequences. The MEROPS classification systematic names these clans alphabetically.

- Clan AA (e.g. Pepsin family)
- Clan AC (e.g. Signal peptidase II family)
- Clan AD (e.g. Presenilin family)
- Clan AE (e.g. GPR endopeptidase family)
- Clan AF (e.g. Omptin family)

== Propeptide ==
A1_Propeptide
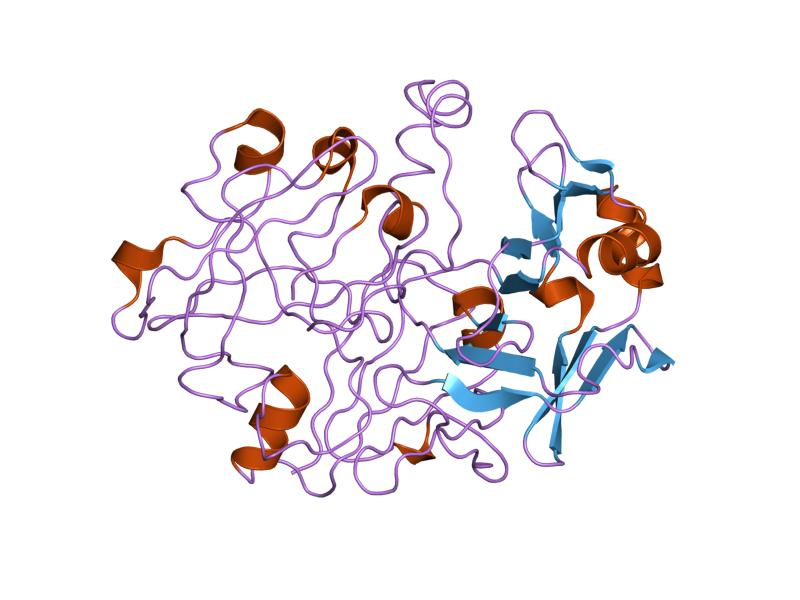
- crystal and molecular structures of human progastricsin at 1.62 angstroms resolution

Identifiers
- Symbol: A1_Propeptide
- Pfam: PF07966
- InterPro: IPR012848
Available protein structures:
- PDB: IPR012848 PF07966 (ECOD; PDBsum)
- AlphaFold: IPR012848; PF07966

Many eukaryotic aspartic endopeptidases (MEROPS peptidase family A1) are synthesised with signal and propeptides. The animal pepsin-like endopeptidase propeptides form a distinct family of propeptides, which contain a conserved motif approximately 30 residues long. In pepsinogen A, the first 11 residues of the mature pepsin sequence are displaced by residues of the propeptide. The propeptide contains two helices that block the active site cleft, in particular the conserved Asp11 residue, in pepsin, hydrogen bonds to a conserved Arg residue in the propeptide. This hydrogen bond stabilises the propeptide conformation and is probably responsible for triggering the conversion of pepsinogen to pepsin under acidic conditions.

== Examples ==
=== Human ===
- BACE1, BACE2
- Cathepsin D
- Cathepsin E
- Chymosin (or "rennin")
- Napsin-A
- Nepenthesin
- Pepsin
- Presenilin
- Renin

=== Human proteins of peptidase A1 family ===
BACE1; BACE2; CTSD; CTSE; NAPSA; PGA3; PGA4; PGA5; PGC; REN;

=== Other organisms ===
- HIV-1 protease – a major drug-target for treatment of HIV
- Plasmepsin – a group of aspartyl proteases found in the Malaria-causing parasite Plasmodium

== See also ==
- Glutamic protease
- The Proteolysis Map
