= OmpT =

Bacterial protein

Protease 7
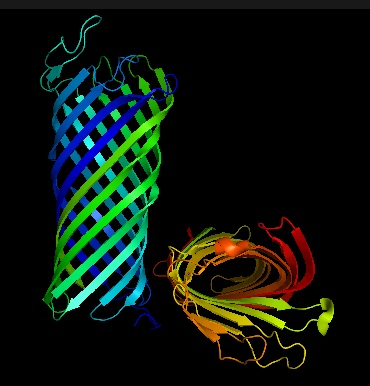
- Crystal Structure of OmpT visualised in PyMOL, lateral and aerial views (PDB: 1I78).

Identifiers
- Organism: Escherichia coli (strain K12)
- Symbol: OmpT
- UniProt: P09169
Search for
- Structures: Swiss-model
- Domains: InterPro

Outer membrane protease, Plasmid F

Identifiers
- Organism: Escherichia coli (strain K12)
- Symbol: OmpP
- UniProt: P34210
Search for
- Structures: Swiss-model
- Domains: InterPro

OmpT is an aspartyl protease found on the outer membrane of Escherichia coli. OmpT is a subtype of the family of omptin proteases, which are found on some gram-negative species of bacteria.

== Structure ==
OmpT is a 33.5 kDa outer membrane protein consisting of 10 antiparallel strands that are connected by 5 extracellular loops. The antiparallel strands form a beta barrel structure that spans the width of the membrane, creating a pore.

E. coli omptins can be coded either from the OmpT gene on a chromosome (part of a DLP12 prophage) or from OmpP on a plasmid (OmpP). The sequences resulting from these two sources differ by 24-25% in the mature protease.

Genetic differences between OmpT and other members of the omptin family are found in the extracellular loops, and therefore, this area is thought to be associated with substrate specificity. Also, the barrel is relatively rigid, while the loops have more flexibility to bind to substrates of varying sizes.

== Mechanism ==
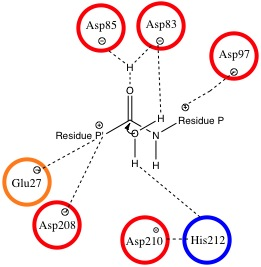
Schematic representing the residues on OmpT that mediate the nucleophilic attack of water during peptide cleavage.

While originally thought to be a serine protease, OmpT is better characterized as an aspartyl protease because of its cleavage mechanism.

The substrate of OmpT binds to negatively charged aspartate and glutamate residues, so the active site of the protease is anionic. This causes OmpT to selectively cleave peptides between two basic (positively charged) residues. The active site of OmpT resembles that of other omptins, and is characterized by conserved residues at Asp84, Asp86, Asp206, and His208. The most common bond cleavage by OmpT is between two arginine residues because their positive charge can favorably interact with the negatively charged species at the active site during substrate binding.

Because of the specificity of the active site, OmpT does not act on peptides with a negatively charged residue adjacent to the scissile bond. Also, OmpT is specifically identified an endopeptidase because it does not cleave peptides at the N- or C-terminus, but only between nonterminal amino acids.

The peptide bond cleavage occurs via the nucleophilic attack of water at the carbonyl between two adjacent amino acid residues. Water enters the protease from the intracellular surface and is stabilized by Asp83 and His212. During the proton transfer associated with the peptide cleavage, the negatively charged aspartate residue stabilizes the positively charged histidine. Once docked in this position, water is positioned to attack the peptide in the active site.

The cleavage of peptide bonds by OmpT is also dependent on the presence of bound lipopolysaccharide (LPS). When LPS is not present, the peptide binds too deeply within the active site, and the water cannot reach the carbonyl for its nucleophilic attack of the scissile bond.

== Biological function and disease relevance ==
In E. coli, OmpT is a housekeeping protease that degrades foreign peptide material that the bacteria encounters. Because of its ability to cleave peptides present in its surrounding environment, OmpT is associated with several pathologies.

=== Urinary tract infections ===
Urinary tract infections (UTIs) are often due to E. coli entering the urethra and colonizing. The host's immune system will release protamines and other antimicrobials to combat the infection, but OmpT easily degrades the cationic protamine peptides, thus enhancing the risk of infection. There is a genetic link between OmpT and other UTI-mediating factors (such as kpsMT, cnf1, prf, and sfa), but the functional link between these proteins is not well defined.

=== Intestinal colonization and sepsis ===
Enterohemorrhagic E. coli (EHEC) and enteropathogenic E. coli (EPEC) are pathogens that rely on OmpT to colonize in the intestine of their host. In response to the presence of E. coli in the gut, the host releases antimicrobial peptides as part of the innate immune response. Since OmpT can break down these antimicrobials and inactivate them, EHEC and EPEC can colonize within the colon or small intestine of the host and lead to serious diarrheal diseases.

In the case of sepsis, the host activates the blood clotting system to deposit fibrin and limit the spread of bacteria throughout the blood. However, OmpT can inactivate the tissue factor pathway inhibitor (TFPI), counteracting the host's immune response, and further perpetuating the spread of extraintestinal E. coli infection.

=== Evolved suicidal action of OmpT ===
In zebrafish, ZF-RNase-3 (A5HAK0) must be cleaved by a protease (such as OmpT) in order to become activated and serve its bactericidal function. Through this evolved suicidal mechanism, the RNase mediates its own activation, since it is only cleaved in the presence of its bacterial target.

== Other applications ==
OmpT has been identified as a potential probe to use in mass spectrometry-based proteomics, because its substrate specificity allows it to differentiate between proteins with related primary sequences.
