= Nepenthesin =

Aspartic protease found in some plants

Identifiers
- EC no.: 3.4.23.12
- CAS no.: 9073-80-7

Databases
- IntEnz: IntEnz view
- BRENDA: BRENDA entry
- ExPASy: NiceZyme view
- KEGG: KEGG entry
- MetaCyc: metabolic pathway
- PRIAM: profile
- PDB structures: RCSB PDB PDBe PDBsum
Search
- PMC: articles
- PubMed: articles
- NCBI: proteins

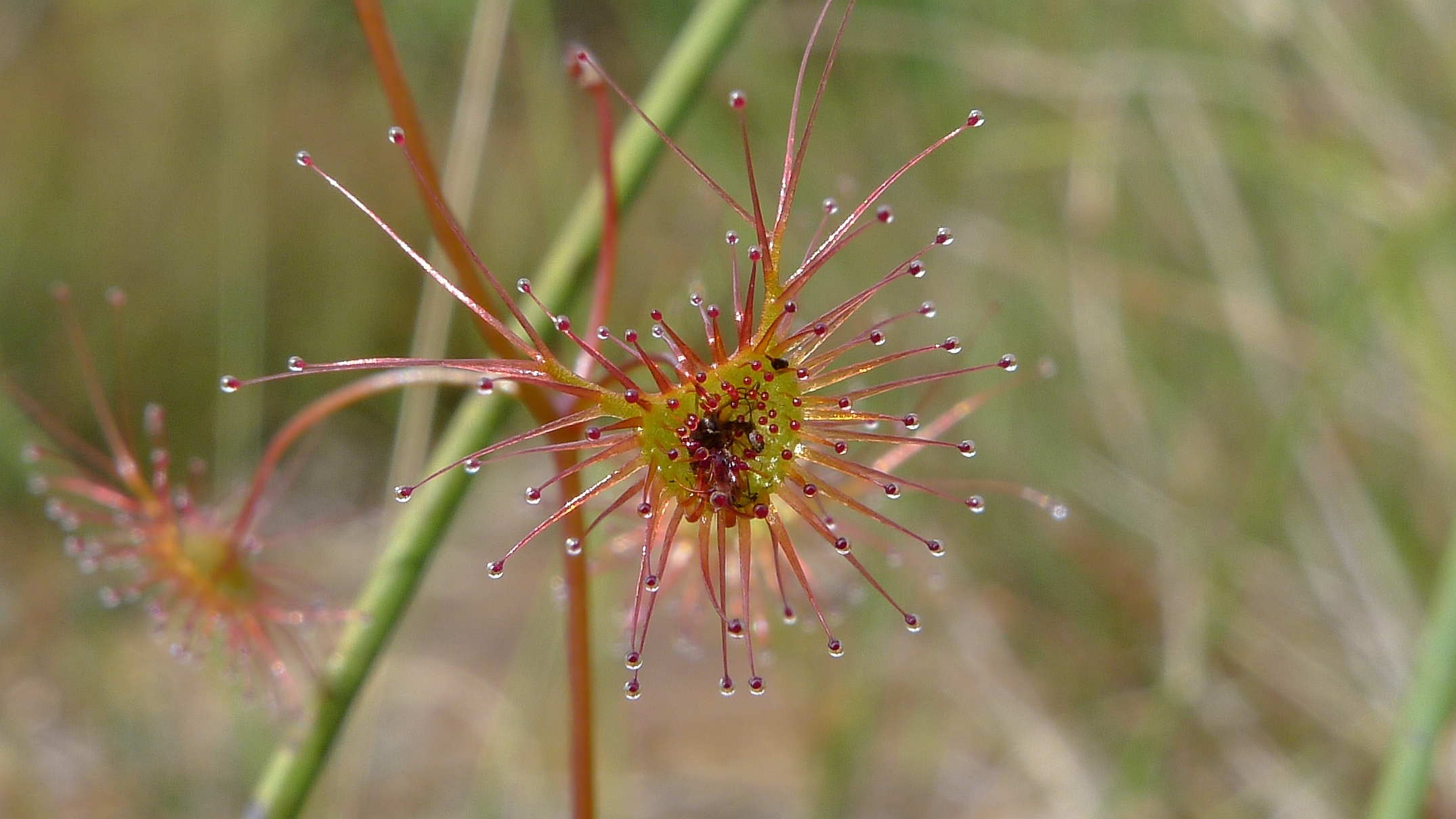
Leaf of a Drosera peltata with a captured ant. Royal National Park, NSW Australia, 2011.

Nepenthesin (also spelled nepenthacin or nepenthasin) is an aspartic protease of plant origin that has so far been identified in the pitcher secretions of Nepenthes and in the leaves of Drosera peltata. It is similar to pepsin, but differs in that it also cleaves on either side of Asp residues and at Lys┼Arg. While more pH and temperature stable than porcine pepsin A, it is considerably less stable in urea or guanidine hydrochloride. It is the only known protein with such a stability profile.

The name nepenthesin was coined in 1968 by Shigeru Nakayama and Shizuko Amagase. Alternative names for this enzyme include Nepenthes acid proteinase and Nepenthes aspartic proteinase. Two isozymes have been identified in Nepenthes: nepenthesin I and nepenthesin II. The production of large quantities of nepenthesin-1 through heterologous expression in Escherichia coli was described in 2014.

The names cephalotusin, dionaeasin and droserasin have been proposed for similar aspartic endopeptidases originating from the carnivorous plant genera Cephalotus, Dionaea and Drosera, respectively.

== Discovery ==
In the late 19th century, Sydney Howard Vines showed that the pitcher fluid from Nepenthes could digest protein in acidic conditions. He suggested the plants were making a digestive enzyme, for which he proposed the name "nepenthin". In the late 1960s, Josef Weigl's group in Germany and Shizuko Amagase's group in Japan each used chromatography to purify the proteolytic activity from several Nepenthes species, finding it to be most active at pH 2–3. Amagase and Shigeru Nakayama proposed the name "Nepenthesin" for the responsible protease(s). In 1998, Kenji Takahashi's group purified protein from 30 liters of Nepenthesia distillatoria fluid, finding activity similar to that previously described, and reporting part of the nepenthesin amino acid sequence.
