= NAPSA =

Protein-coding gene in humans

Identifiers
- Aliases: NAPSA, KAP, Kdap, NAP1, NAPA, SNAPA, napsin A aspartic peptidase
- External IDs: OMIM: 605631; MGI: 109365; GeneCards: NAPSA

Gene location (Human)
Chr.	Chromosome 19 (human)
Band	19q13.33	Start	50,358,477 bp
Band	19q13.33	End	50,365,830 bp

Gene location (Mouse)
Chr.	Chromosome 7 (mouse)
Band	7|7 B3	Start	44,221,804 bp
Band	7|7 B3	End	44,236,286 bp
RNA expression pattern
Bgee	Human / Mouse (ortholog); Top expressed in: lower lobe of lung; upper lobe of lung; upper lobe of left lung; visceral pleura; right lung; human kidney; testicle; right uterine tube; mucosa of transverse colon; caput epididymis / Top expressed in: right kidney; human kidney; left lung; right lung; left lung lobe; right lung lobe; proximal tubule; spleen; granulocyte; tibiofemoral joint; More reference expression data
BioGPS	n/a
Gene ontology
Molecular function	endopeptidase activity; hydrolase activity; aspartic-type endopeptidase activity; peptidase activity
Cellular component	extracellular region; lysosome; extracellular exosome; alveolar lamellar body; multivesicular body lumen; extracellular space
Biological process	surfactant homeostasis; protein catabolic process; proteolysis; membrane protein proteolysis; autophagy
Sources:Amigo / QuickGO
Orthologs
Databases	NCBI: entry; OMA: entry
Species	Human	Mouse
Entrez	9476	16541
Ensembl	ENSG00000131400	ENSMUSG00000002204
UniProt	O96009	O09043
RefSeq (mRNA)	NM_004851	NM_008437
RefSeq (protein)	NP_004842	NP_032463
Location (UCSC)	Chr 19: 50.36 – 50.37 Mb	Chr 7: 44.22 – 44.24 Mb
PubMed search
- Wikidata
View/Edit Human	View/Edit Mouse

Napsin-A is an aspartic proteinase that is encoded in humans by the NAPSA gene. The name napsin comes from novel aspartic proteinase of the pepsin family.

The activation peptide of an aspartic proteinase acts as an inhibitor of the active site. These peptide segments, or pro-parts, are deemed important for correct folding, targeting, and control of the activation of aspartic proteinase zymogens. The pronapsin A gene is expressed predominantly in lung and kidney. Its translation product is predicted to be a fully functional, glycosylated aspartic proteinase precursor containing an RGD motif and an additional 18 residues at its C-terminus.

== Utility ==
Detection of NAPSA gene expression can be used to distinguish adenocarcinomas from other forms of lung cancer.
