= Plasmepsin =

Group of Plasmodium enzymes

Plasmepsin I

Identifiers
- EC no.: 3.4.23.38
- CAS no.: 180189-87-1

Databases
- BRENDA: enzyme data
- ExPASy: NiceZyme view
- KEGG: enzyme entry
- MetaCyc: metabolic pathway
- Rhea: reactions
- PDB structures: RCSB PDB PDBe PDBsum
Search
- PMC: articles
- PubMed: articles
- NCBI: proteins

Plasmepsin II
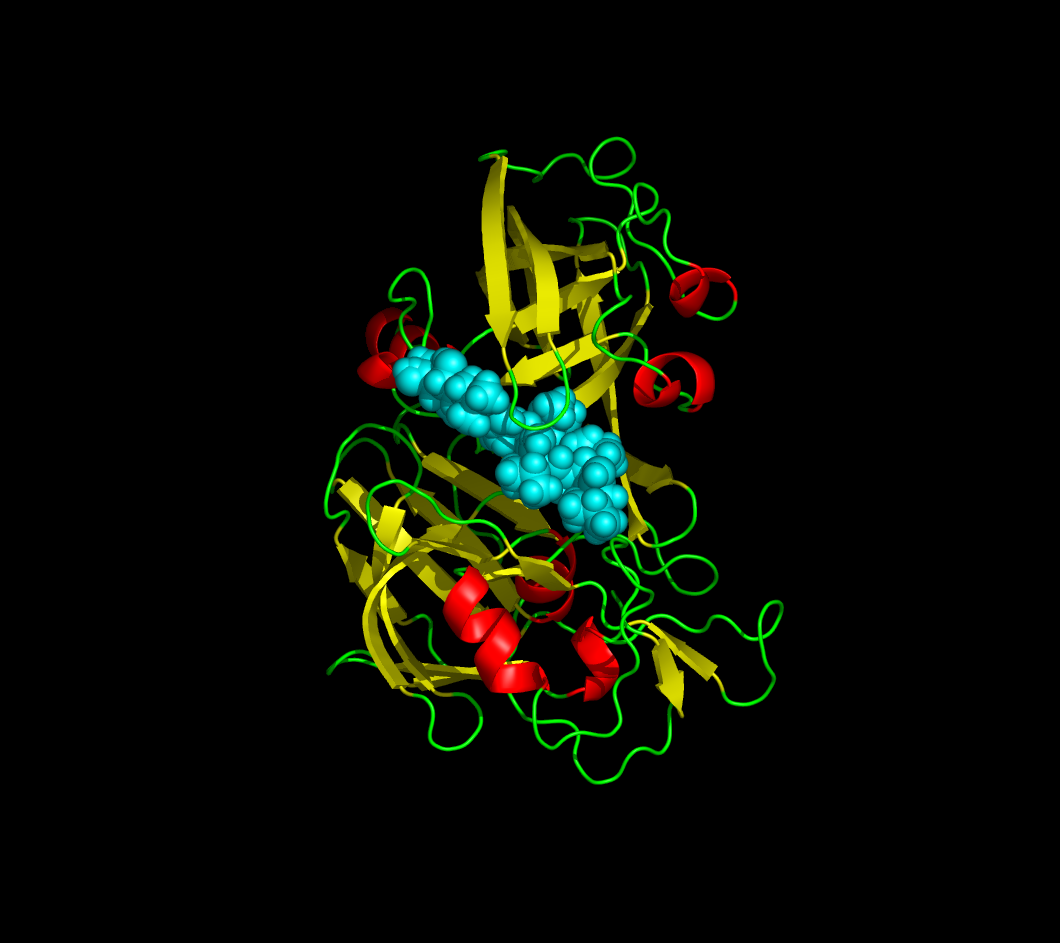
- Plasmepsin II complexed with inhibitor pepstatin A (PDB: 1SME).

Identifiers
- EC no.: 3.4.23.39
- CAS no.: 159447-18-4

Databases
- BRENDA: enzyme data
- ExPASy: NiceZyme view
- KEGG: enzyme entry
- MetaCyc: metabolic pathway
- Rhea: reactions
- PDB structures: RCSB PDB PDBe PDBsum
Search
- PMC: articles
- PubMed: articles
- NCBI: proteins

Plasmepsins are a class of at least 10 enzymes (EC 3.4.23.38 and EC 3.4.23.39) produced by the Plasmodium falciparum parasite. There are ten different isoforms of these proteins and ten genes coding them respectively in Plasmodium (Plm I, II, III, IV, V, VI, VII, IX, X and HAP). It has been suggested that the plasmepsin family is smaller in other human Plasmodium species. Expression of Plm I, II, IV, V, IX, X and HAP occurs in the erythrocytic cycle, and expression of Plm VI, VII, VIII, occurs in the exoerythrocytic cycle. Through their haemoglobin-degrading activity, they are an important cause of symptoms in malaria sufferers. Consequently, this family of enzymes is a potential target for antimalarial drugs.

Plasmepsins are aspartic acid proteases, meaning their active site contains two aspartic acid residues. These two aspartic acid residues act respectively as proton donor and proton acceptor, catalysing the hydrolysis of peptide bonds in proteins.

There are four types of plasmepsins, closely related but varying in the specificity of cleavage site. Plasmepsins I and II cleave hemoglobin between residues Phenylalanine 33 and Leucine 34 of α-globin subunit.

The name plasmepsin may come from Plasmodium (the organism) and pepsin (a common aspartic acid protease with similar molecular structure).

The closest (non-pathogenic) enzymatic equivalent in humans is the beta-secretase enzyme.
