= Protease VII =

Protease VII may refer to:

- Omptin
- Caspase 1
