= Pepsin B =

Identifiers
- EC no.: 3.4.23.2
- CAS no.: 9025-48-3

Databases
- IntEnz: IntEnz view
- BRENDA: BRENDA entry
- ExPASy: NiceZyme view
- KEGG: KEGG entry
- MetaCyc: metabolic pathway
- PRIAM: profile
- PDB structures: RCSB PDB PDBe PDBsum
Search
- PMC: articles
- PubMed: articles
- NCBI: proteins

Pepsin B (EC 3.4.23.2, parapepsin I, pig gelatinase) is an enzyme. This enzyme catalyses the following chemical reaction

Degradation of gelatin, with manor activity on hemoglobin. Specificity for B chain of insulin is more restricted than that of pepsin A

This enzyme is formed from pig pepsinogen B.

== See also ==
- Pepsin
