= Cathepsin E =

Protein found in humans

CTSE
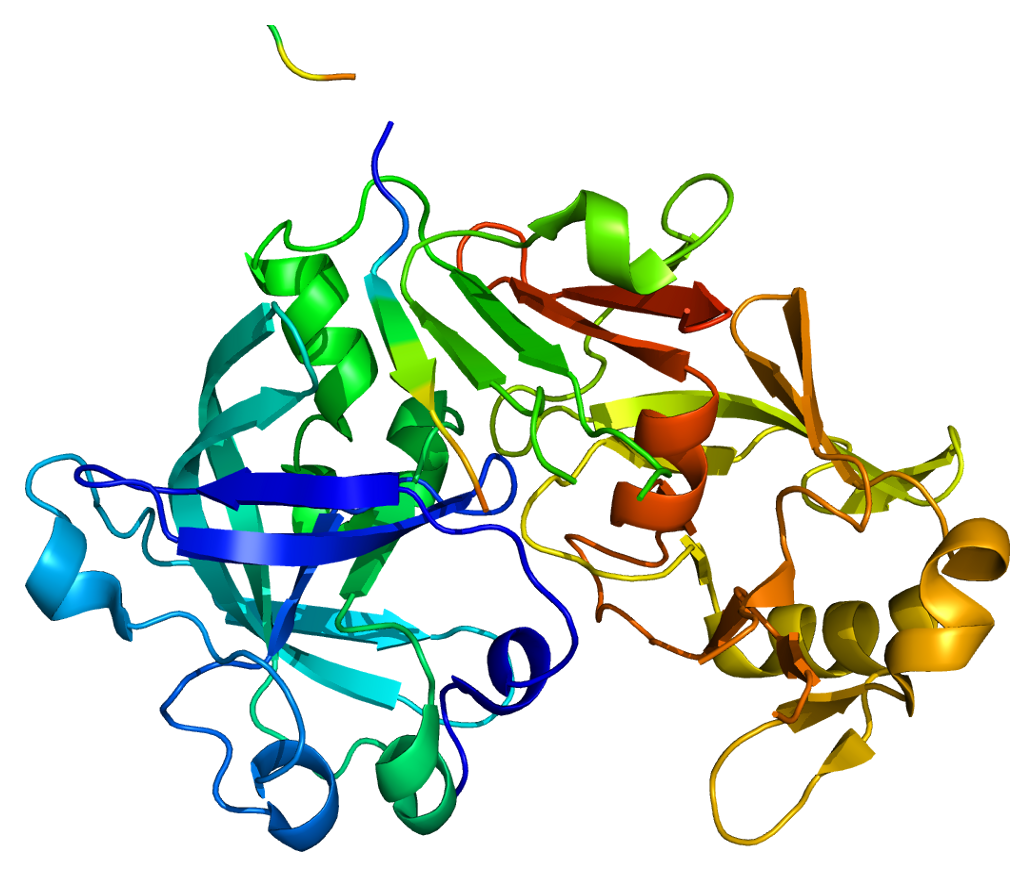

Identifiers
- Aliases: CTSE, Ctse, A430072O03Rik, C920004C08Rik, CE, CatE, cathepsin E
- External IDs: OMIM: 116890; MGI: 107361; GeneCards: CTSE
Available structures
PDB	Ortholog search: PDBe RCSB
PDB	List of PDB id codes 1TZS
Enzyme activity
EC #	BRENDA	ExPASy	KEGG	MetaCyc
3.4.23.34	↗	↗	↗	↗

Gene location (Human)
Chr.	Chromosome 1 (human)
Band	1q32.1	Start	206,008,535 bp
Band	1q32.1	End	206,023,909 bp

Gene location (Mouse)
Chr.	Chromosome 1 (mouse)
Band	1 E4|1 57.14 cM	Start	131,566,044 bp
Band	1 E4|1 57.14 cM	End	131,603,243 bp
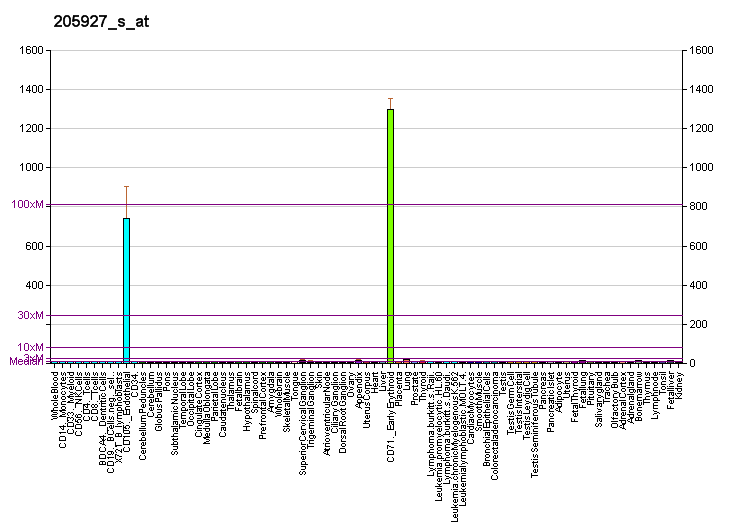
RNA expression pattern
Bgee	Human / Mouse (ortholog); Top expressed in: jejunal mucosa; duodenum; visceral pleura; pylorus; pancreatic ductal cell; trabecular bone; gastric mucosa; lower lobe of lung; rectum; body of stomach / Top expressed in: epithelium of stomach; mucous cell of stomach; pyloric antrum; tibiofemoral joint; transitional epithelium of urinary bladder; fetal liver hematopoietic progenitor cell; spleen; left colon; body of femur; blood; More reference expression data
BioGPS	More reference expression data
Gene ontology
Molecular function	peptidase activity; hydrolase activity; protein homodimerization activity; aspartic-type endopeptidase activity
Cellular component	endosome
Biological process	protein autoprocessing; protein catabolic process; antigen processing and presentation of exogenous peptide antigen via MHC class II; proteolysis
Sources:Amigo / QuickGO
Orthologs
Databases	NCBI: entry; OMA: entry
Species	Human	Mouse
Entrez	1510	13034
Ensembl	ENSG00000196188	ENSMUSG00000004552
UniProt	P14091	P70269
RefSeq (mRNA)	NM_001910; NM_148964; NM_001317331	NM_007799
RefSeq (protein)	NP_001304260; NP_001901; NP_683865	NP_031825
Location (UCSC)	Chr 1: 206.01 – 206.02 Mb	Chr 1: 131.57 – 131.6 Mb
PubMed search
- Wikidata
View/Edit Human	View/Edit Mouse

Cathepsin E

Identifiers
- EC no.: 3.4.23.34
- CAS no.: 110910-42-4

Databases
- BRENDA: enzyme data
- ExPASy: NiceZyme view
- KEGG: enzyme entry
- MetaCyc: metabolic pathway
- Rhea: reactions
- PDB structures: RCSB PDB PDBe PDBsum
Search
- PMC: articles
- PubMed: articles
- NCBI: proteins

Cathepsin E is an enzyme (EC 3.4.23.34) that in humans is encoded by the CTSE gene. The enzyme is also known as slow-moving proteinase, erythrocyte membrane aspartic proteinase, SMP, EMAP, non-pepsin proteinase, cathepsin D-like acid proteinase, cathepsin E-like acid proteinase, cathepsin D-type proteinase) is an enzyme.

Cathepsin E is a protease found in animals, as well as various other organisms, that belongs to the aspartic protease group. In humans it is encoded by the CTSE gene located at 1q32 on chromosome 1. It is an intracellular non-lysosomal glycoprotein that is mainly found in the skin and in immune cells. The protein is an aspartyl protease that functions as a disulfide-linked homodimer, and has an oligosaccharide chain of the high-mannose type. It is a member of the peptidase A1 family, and therefore observes specificity similar to that of Pepsin A and Cathepsin D. Cathepsin E is an intracellular enzyme and does not appear to be involved in dietary protein digestion. It is found at highest abundance on the stomach’s epithelial mucus producing cell surfaces. It is the first aspartic protease present in the fetal stomach and is found in more than half of gastric cancers, leading to it appearing to be an oncofetal antigen. Transcript variants utilizing alternative polyadenylation signals and two transcript variants encoding different isoforms exist for this gene.

A deficiency in the levels of Cathepsin E in the body may play a part in inflammatory skin diseases such as atopic dermatitis, for which treatment would rely on fixing functionality and levels of the protein in the body. Along with renin and Cathepsin D, Cathepsin E is one of the only few aspartic proteases known to be made in human tissues other than those of gastrointestinal and reproductive tracts.

== Structure ==
The structure of Cathepsin E is very similar to those of Cathepsin D and BACE1, and all 3 have almost identical active site regions. The differences between them lie in the microenvironments that surround their active sites. Residues DTG 96-98 and DTG 281-283 contribute to the formation of the enzyme’s active site. There are also two pairs of disulfide bonds at residues Cys 272-276 and Cys 314-351. Two other Cys residues at positions 109 and 114 on the amino acid chain reside close to teach other in three dimensional space, however the distance between their sulfur atoms is 3.53 Å which is too large for the formation of a proper disulfide bond. The structure also has four hydrogen bonds between the Asp residues of the active site and the surrounding residues. A distinguishing factor of Cathepsin E in comparison with the structure of Cathepsin D and BACE1 can be seen at the formation of an extra hydrogen bond between the Asp 96 and Ser 99 residues, and absence of a hydrogen bond with Leu/Met at Asp 281.

== Location ==
The enzyme is distributed in cells of the gastrointestinal tracts, lymphoid tissues, blood cells, urinary organs and microglia. Its intracellular localization in different mammalian cells is different to that of its analog Cathepsin D. Cathepsin E associates with the membrane tissue in the intracellular canaliculi of gastric parietal cells, bile canaliculi of hepatic cells, cells of the rinal proximal tubule in the kidney, epithelial cells in the intestine, trachea and bronchi, osteoclasts and even in erythrocytes. Its localization in the endosome structures can be seen in many different cell types such as antigen-presenting B cell lymphoblasts, gastric cells and microglia. Its presence is also detected in the cisternae of the cell’s endoplasmic reticulum.

== Function ==
Cathepsin E plays a vital role in protein degradation, antigen processing via the MHC class II pathway and bioactive protein generation. The enzyme is also thought to be involved in age induced neuronal death pathway execution as well as the excessive stimulation of glutamate receptors with excitotoxins and transient forebrain ischemia. In an experiment carried out on rats, Cathepsin E was barely detected in the brain tissues of young rats, however in older rats its level was greatly increased in the neostriatum and cerebral cortex. The enzyme was also expressed at high levels in the activated microglia of the hippocampal CA1 region and in degenerating neurons for a week after transient forebrain ischemia. Cathepsin E has a possible role in the development of well differentiated adenocarcinoma from intestinal metaplasia. The enzyme also plays a part in association with dendritic cells where it generates the CD4 repertoire in response to self and foreign proteins.

== Post-translational modification ==
The enzyme is glycosylated. Different cell types contribute to the differences in the nature of the carbohydrate chain. A high mannose-type oligosaccharide is observed in the proenzyme in fibroblasts, however the mature enzyme can be seen with a complex-type oligosaccharide. In the membranes of erythrocytes, the mature enzyme and the pro-enzyme both have a complex-type oligosaccharide. Auto catalytic cleavage produces two forms of the enzyme, with Form 1 beginning at residue Ile 54 and Form 2 at Thr 57.

== See also ==
- Cathepsin
