= Yapsin 1 =

Identifiers
- EC no.: 3.4.23.41
- CAS no.: 205132-58-7

Databases
- IntEnz: IntEnz view
- BRENDA: BRENDA entry
- ExPASy: NiceZyme view
- KEGG: KEGG entry
- MetaCyc: metabolic pathway
- PRIAM: profile
- PDB structures: RCSB PDB PDBe PDBsum
Search
- PMC: articles
- PubMed: articles
- NCBI: proteins

Yapsin 1 (EC 3.4.23.41, yeast aspartic protease 3, Yap3 gene product (Saccharomyces cerevisiae)) is an enzyme. This enzyme catalyses the following chemical reaction

Hydrolyses various precursor proteins with Arg or Lys in P1, and commonly Arg or Lys also in P2. The P3 amino acid is usually non-polar, but otherwise additional basic amino acids are favourable in both non-prime and prime positions

This enzyme belongs to the peptidase family A1 of pepsin.
