= Progastricsin =

PGC

Identifiers
- Aliases: PGC, PEPC, PGII, gastricsin, progastricsin (pepsinogen C), progastricsin
- External IDs: OMIM: 169740; MGI: 98909; GeneCards: PGC
Available structures
PDB	Ortholog search: PDBe RCSB
PDB	List of PDB id codes 1AVF, 1HTR
Enzyme activity
EC #	BRENDA	ExPASy	KEGG	MetaCyc
3.4.23.3	↗	↗	↗	↗

Gene location (Human)
Chr.	Chromosome 6 (human)
Band	6p21.1	Start	41,736,711 bp
Band	6p21.1	End	41,754,109 bp

Gene location (Mouse)
Chr.	Chromosome 17 (mouse)
Band	17 C|17 23.98 cM	Start	48,037,767 bp
Band	17 C|17 23.98 cM	End	48,045,407 bp
RNA expression pattern
Bgee	Human / Mouse (ortholog); Top expressed in: pylorus; cardia; lower lobe of lung; seminal vesicula; right uterine tube; body of stomach; upper lobe of lung; upper lobe of left lung; fundus; body of pancreas / Top expressed in: pyloric antrum; epithelium of stomach; mucous cell of stomach; duodenum; yolk sac; esophagus; blastocyst; tongue; embryo; thymus; More reference expression data
BioGPS	More reference expression data
Gene ontology
Molecular function	peptidase activity; hydrolase activity; aspartic-type endopeptidase activity
Cellular component	extracellular region; extracellular space
Biological process	positive regulation of antibacterial peptide production; digestion; protein catabolic process; proteolysis; autophagy
Sources:Amigo / QuickGO
Orthologs
Databases	NCBI: entry; OMA: entry
Species	Human	Mouse
Entrez	5225	109820
Ensembl	ENSG00000096088	ENSMUSG00000023987
UniProt	P20142	Q9D7R7
RefSeq (mRNA)	NM_002630; NM_001166424	NM_025973
RefSeq (protein)	NP_001159896; NP_002621	NP_080249
Location (UCSC)	Chr 6: 41.74 – 41.75 Mb	Chr 17: 48.04 – 48.05 Mb
PubMed search
- Wikidata
View/Edit Human	View/Edit Mouse

Progastricsin also known as pepsinogen C or pepsinogen II is a pepsinogen precursor of the enzyme gastricsin that in humans is encoded by the PGC gene.

== Function ==
Progastricsin is an aspartic proteinase that belongs to the peptidase family A1. The encoded protein is a digestive enzyme that is produced in the stomach and constitutes a major component of the gastric mucosa. This protein is also secreted into the serum. This protein is synthesized as an inactive zymogen that includes a highly basic prosegment. This enzyme is converted into its active mature form at low pH by sequential cleavage of the prosegment that is carried out by the enzyme itself.

== Clinical significance ==
Polymorphisms in this gene are associated with susceptibility to gastric cancers. Serum levels of this enzyme are used as a biomarker for certain gastric diseases including Helicobacter pylori related gastritis.
