= Verubecestat =

Chemical compound

Clinical data
- Other names: MK-8931
- ATC code: None

Legal status
- Legal status: Investigational

Identifiers
- IUPAC name: N-{3-[(5R)-3-amino-2,5-dimethyl-1,1-dioxo-1,2,5,6-tetrahydro-1λ^{6},2,4-thiadiazin-5-yl]-4-fluorophenyl}-5-fluoropyridine-2-carboxamide
- CAS Number: 1286770-55-5
- PubChem CID: 51352361
- ChemSpider: 31399364
- UNII: J1I0P6WT7T
- KEGG: D10739
- CompTox Dashboard (EPA): DTXSID301020622

Chemical and physical data
- Formula: C_{17}H_{17}F_{2}N_{5}O_{3}S
- Molar mass: 409.41 g·mol^{−1}
- 3D model (JSmol): Interactive image
- SMILES: C[C@]1(CS(=O)(=O)N(C(=N1)N)C)c2cc(ccc2F)NC(=O)c3ccc(cn3)F
- InChI: InChI=1S/C17H17F2N5O3S/c1-17(9-28(26,27)24(2)16(20)23-17)12-7-11(4-5-13(12)19)22-15(25)14-6-3-10(18)8-21-14/h3-8H,9H2,1-2H3,(H2,20,23)(H,22,25)/t17-/m0/s1; Key:YHYKUSGACIYRML-KRWDZBQOSA-N

Verubecestat (MK-8931) was an experimental drug for the treatment of Alzheimer's disease. It is an inhibitor of beta-secretase 1 (BACE1), which, after initial promise proved disappointing.

In April 2012 phase I clinical results were announced. Phase 1b results have also been reported.

As of December 2016 it was in two phase 2/3 clinical trials that have progressed to phase 3. EPOCH, was to complete data collection for the primary outcome measure by June 2017. However, in February 2017 Merck halted its late-stage trial of verubecestat for mild to moderate Alzheimer's disease after it was reported as having "virtually no chance of finding a positive clinical effect" according to an independent panel of experts. The results of Merck's trial of verubecestat on patients with prodromal (early stage) Alzheimer's were expected in February 2019. However, the trial was terminated in February 2018, after a data monitoring committee concluded it was unlikely that the drug would show a positive benefit/risk ratio. The final conclusion was that "verubecestat did not reduce cognitive or functional decline in patients with mild-to-moderate Alzheimer’s disease and was associated with treatment-related adverse events". Verubecestat was projected to be a breakthrough medicine for dementia related illness, however it is still unknown why the medicine was not effective in humans.
