= GPR endopeptidase =

Class of enzymes

Gpr endopeptidase

Identifiers
- EC no.: 3.4.24.78
- CAS no.: 75718-32-0

Databases
- IntEnz: IntEnz view
- BRENDA: BRENDA entry
- ExPASy: NiceZyme view
- KEGG: KEGG entry
- MetaCyc: metabolic pathway
- PRIAM: profile
- PDB structures: RCSB PDB PDBe PDBsum
Search
- PMC: articles
- PubMed: articles
- NCBI: proteins

GPR endopeptidase (EC 3.4.24.78, germination proteinase) is an enzyme. This enzyme catalyses the following chemical reaction:

Endopeptidase action with P4 Glu or Asp, P1 preferably Glu > Asp, P1' hydrophobic and P2' Ala

This enzyme participates in spore germination in Bacillus megaterium.
