= Signal peptidase II =

Identifiers
- EC no.: 3.4.23.36
- CAS no.: 171715-14-3

Databases
- IntEnz: IntEnz view
- BRENDA: BRENDA entry
- ExPASy: NiceZyme view
- KEGG: KEGG entry
- MetaCyc: metabolic pathway
- PRIAM: profile
- PDB structures: RCSB PDB PDBe PDBsum
Search
- PMC: articles
- PubMed: articles
- NCBI: proteins

Signal peptidase II (EC 3.4.23.36, premurein-leader peptidase, prolipoprotein signal peptidase, leader peptidase II, premurein leader proteinase) is an enzyme.

This enzyme catalyses a chemical reaction. It releases signal peptides from murein prolipoprotein and other bacterial membrane prolipoproteins. It also hydrolyses -Xaa-Yaa-Zaa-(S,diacylglyceryl)Cys-, in which Yaa (Ala or Ser) and Zaa (Gly or Ala) have small neutral sidechains, and Xaa is hydrophobic (preferably Leu).

This enzyme is present in bacterial inner membranes.
