= Lanabecestat =

Names
- Systematic IUPAC name (1,4-trans,1'R)-4-methoxy-5''-methyl-6'-[5-(prop-1-yn-1-yl)pyridin-3-yl]-3'H-dispiro[cyclohexane-1,2'-indene-1',2''-imidazol]-4''-amine
- Other names AZD3293; LY3314814

Identifiers
CAS Number	1383982-64-6
3D model (JSmol)	Interactive image
ChEMBL	ChEMBL3989948
ChemSpider	58177815
KEGG	D10946
PubChem CID	67979346
UNII	X8SPJ492VF
CompTox Dashboard (EPA)	DTXSID101352158
- InChI: InChI=1S/C26H28N4O/c1-4-5-18-12-21(16-28-15-18)19-6-7-20-14-25(10-8-22(31-3)9-11-25)26(23(20)13-19)29-17(2)24(27)30-26/h6-7,12-13,15-16,22H,8-11,14H2,1-3H3,(H2,27,30)/t22-,25-,26-/m0/s1 Key: WKDNQONLGXOZRG-HRNNMHKYSA-N; InChI=1/C26H28N4O/c1-4-5-18-12-21(16-28-15-18)19-6-7-20-14-25(10-8-22(31-3)9-11-25)26(23(20)13-19)29-17(2)24(27)30-26/h6-7,12-13,15-16,22H,8-11,14H2,1-3H3,(H2,27,30)/t22-,25-,26-/m0/s1 Key: WKDNQONLGXOZRG-HRNNMHKYBM
- SMILES: CC#Cc1cncc(c1)c2cc3c(cc2)C[C@@]4([C@@]35N=C(C(=N5)C)N)CC[C@H](CC4)OC

Properties
Chemical formula	C_{26}H_{28}N_{4}O
Molar mass	412.537 g·mol^{−1}
- Except where otherwise noted, data are given for materials in their standard state (at 25 °C [77 °F], 100 kPa). Infobox references

Lanabecestat (formerly known as AZD3293 or LY3314814) is an oral beta-secretase 1 cleaving enzyme (BACE) inhibitor. A BACE inhibitor in theory would prevent the buildup of beta-amyloid and may help slow or stop the progression of Alzheimer's disease.

In September 2014, AstraZeneca and Eli Lilly and Company announced an agreement to co-develop lanabecestat. A pivotal Phase II/III clinical trial of lanabecestat started in late 2014 and is planned to recruit 2,200 patients and end in June 2019. In April 2016 the company announced it would advance to phase 3 without modification. AstraZeneca and Eli Lilly announced in August 2016 that they received FDA fast track designation for lanabecestat. On June 12, 2018, Lilly and AstraZeneca announced that the two ongoing Phase III clinical trials for lanabecestat were not likely to meet their primary endpoint and that all current trials would be stopped due to futility.
