= Pepsinogen 3, group I (pepsinogen A) =

Protein-coding gene in the species Homo sapiens

PGA3

Identifiers
- Aliases: PGA3, pepsinogen 3, group I (pepsinogen A), pepsinogen A3
- External IDs: GeneCards: PGA3
Enzyme activity
EC #	BRENDA	ExPASy	KEGG	MetaCyc
3.4.23.1	↗	↗	↗	↗

Gene location (Human)
Chr.	Chromosome 11 (human)
Band	11q12.2	Start	61,203,307 bp
Band	11q12.2	End	61,213,098 bp
RNA expression pattern
Bgee	Human / Mouse (ortholog); Top expressed in: body of stomach; fundus; right uterine tube; right coronary artery; canal of the cervix; ectocervix; left uterine tube; right adrenal gland; gonad; body of pancreas / n/a; More reference expression data
BioGPS	n/a
Gene ontology
Molecular function	hydrolase activity; peptidase activity; aspartic-type endopeptidase activity
Cellular component	extracellular region; extracellular exosome; multivesicular body lumen
Biological process	digestion; proteolysis; autophagy; protein catabolic process
Sources:Amigo / QuickGO
Orthologs
Databases	NCBI: entry; OMA: entry
Species	Human	Mouse
Entrez	643834	n/a
Ensembl	ENSG00000229859	n/a
UniProt	P0DJD8	n/a
RefSeq (mRNA)	NM_001079807	n/a
RefSeq (protein)	NP_001073275	n/a
Location (UCSC)	Chr 11: 61.2 – 61.21 Mb	n/a
PubMed search		n/a
- Wikidata
View/Edit Human

Pepsinogen 3, group I (pepsinogen A) is a protein that in humans is encoded by the PGA3 gene.

== Function ==
This gene encodes a protein precursor of the digestive enzyme pepsin, a member of the peptidase A1 family of endopeptidases. The encoded precursor is secreted by gastric chief cells and undergoes autocatalytic cleavage in acidic conditions to form the active enzyme, which functions in the digestion of dietary proteins. This gene is found in a cluster of related genes on chromosome 11, each of which encodes one of multiple pepsinogens. Pepsinogen levels in serum may serve as a biomarker for atrophic gastritis and gastric cancer.
