= Pepsin A-5 =

Protein-coding gene in the species Homo sapiens

PGA5
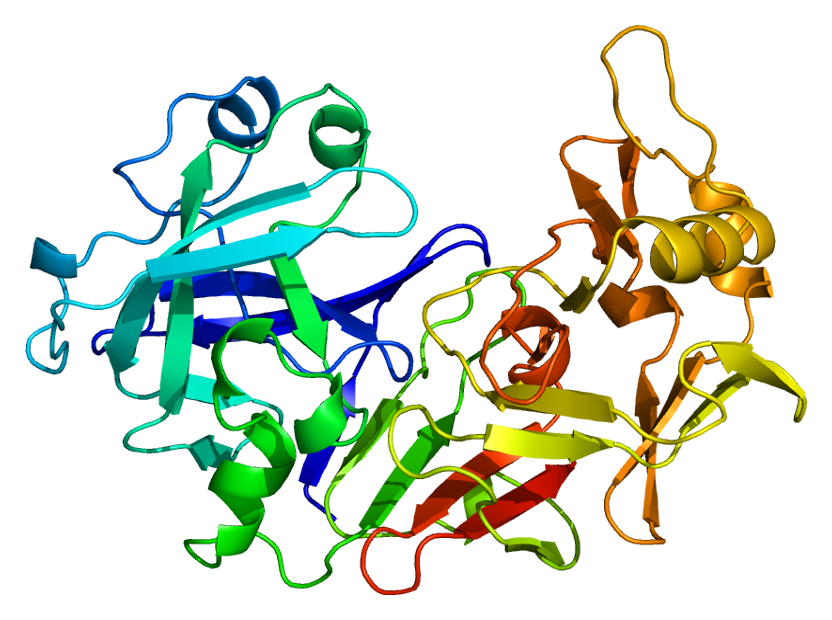

Identifiers
- Aliases: PGA5, Pg5, pepsinogen 5, group I (pepsinogen A), pepsinogen A5
- External IDs: OMIM: 169730; GeneCards: PGA5
Enzyme activity
EC #	BRENDA	ExPASy	KEGG	MetaCyc
3.4.23.1	↗	↗	↗	↗

Gene location (Human)
Chr.	Chromosome 11 (human)
Band	11q12.2	Start	61,241,175 bp
Band	11q12.2	End	61,251,444 bp
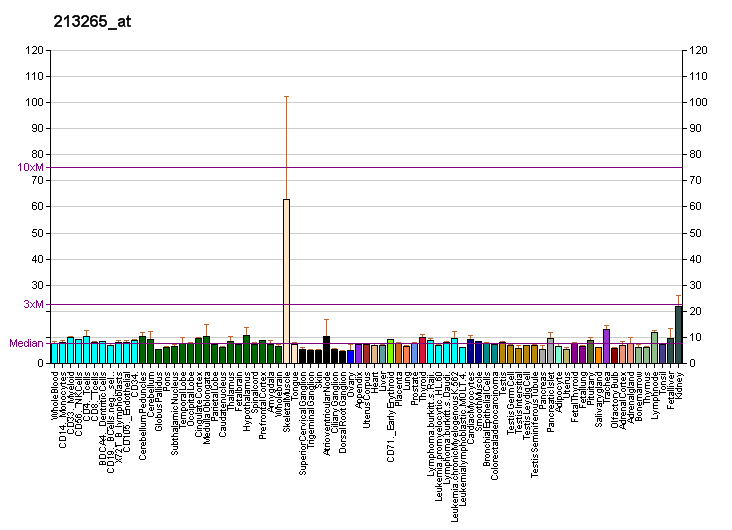
RNA expression pattern
Bgee	Human / Mouse (ortholog); Top expressed in: body of stomach; right uterine tube; testicle; fundus; right coronary artery; canal of the cervix; left uterine tube; ectocervix; body of pancreas; right adrenal gland / n/a; More reference expression data
BioGPS	More reference expression data
Gene ontology
Molecular function	hydrolase activity; aspartic-type endopeptidase activity; peptidase activity
Cellular component	extracellular region; extracellular exosome; multivesicular body lumen
Biological process	digestion; protein catabolic process; proteolysis; autophagy
Sources:Amigo / QuickGO
Orthologs
Databases	NCBI: entry; OMA: entry
Species	Human	Mouse
Entrez	5222	n/a
Ensembl	ENSG00000256713	n/a
UniProt	P0DJD9	n/a
RefSeq (mRNA)	NM_014224	n/a
RefSeq (protein)	NP_055039	n/a
Location (UCSC)	Chr 11: 61.24 – 61.25 Mb	n/a
PubMed search		n/a
- Wikidata
View/Edit Human

Pepsin A-5 is a protein that in humans is encoded by the PGA5 gene.
