= Beta-secretase 1 =

Enzyme

BACE1
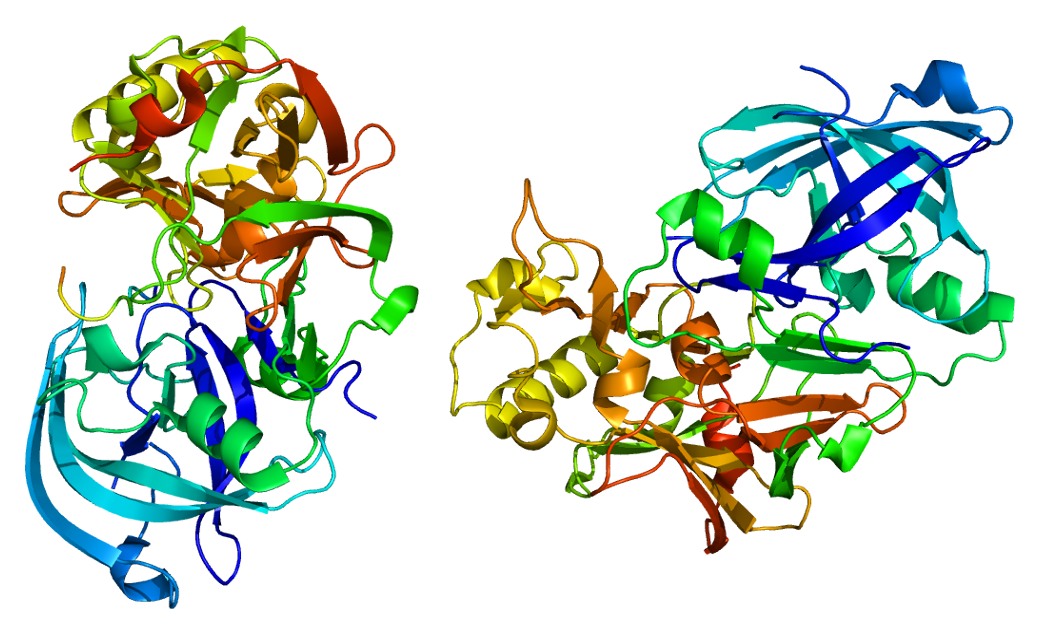

Identifiers
- Aliases: BACE1, ASP2, BACE, HSPC104, beta-secretase 1
- External IDs: OMIM: 604252; MGI: 1346542; GeneCards: BACE1
Available structures
PDB	Ortholog search: PDBe RCSB
PDB	List of PDB id codes 1FKN, 1M4H, 1PY1, 1SGZ, 1TQF, 1UJJ, 1UJK, 1W50, 1W51, 1XN2, 1XN3, 1XS7, 1YM2, 1YM4, 2B8L, 2B8V, 2F3E, 2F3F, 2FDP, 2G94, 2HIZ, 2HM1, 2IQG, 2IRZ, 2IS0, 2NTR, 2OAH, 2OF0, 2OHK, 2OHL, 2OHM, 2OHN, 2OHP, 2OHQ, 2OHR, 2OHS, 2OHT, 2OHU, 2P4J, 2P83, 2P8H, 2PH6, 2PH8, 2Q11, 2Q15, 2QK5, 2QMD, 2QMF, 2QMG, 2QP8, 2QU2, 2QU3, 2QZK, 2QZL, 2VA5, 2VA6, 2VA7, 2VIE, 2VIJ, 2VIY, 2VIZ, 2VJ6, 2VJ7, 2VJ9, 2VKM, 2VNM, 2VNN, 2WEZ, 2WF0, 2WF1, 2WF2, 2WF3, 2WF4, 2WJO, 2XFI, 2XFJ, 2XFK, 2ZDZ, 2ZE1, 2ZHR, 2ZHS, 2ZHT, 2ZHU, 2ZHV, 2ZJH, 2ZJI, 2ZJJ, 2ZJK, 2ZJL, 2ZJM, 2ZJN, 3BRA, 3BUF, 3BUG, 3BUH, 3CIB, 3CIC, 3CID, 3CKP, 3CKR, 3DM6, 3DUY, 3DV1, 3DV5, 3EXO, 3FKT, 3H0B, 3HVG, 3HW1, 3I25, 3IGB, 3IN3, 3IN4, 3IND, 3INE, 3INF, 3INH, 3IVH, 3IVI, 3IXJ, 3IXK, 3KYR, 3L38, 3L3A, 3LHG, 3LNK, 3MSJ, 3MSK, 3MSL, 3N4L, 3NSH, 3OOZ, 3QI1, 3R1G, 3RSV, 3RTM, 3RVI, 3S2O, 3S7L, 3S7M, 3TPJ, 3TPL, 3TPP, 3TPR, 3UDH, 3UDJ, 3UDK, 3UDM, 3UDN, 3UDP, 3UDQ, 3UDR, 3UDY, 3UFL, 3UQP, 3UQR, 3UQU, 3UQW, 3UQX, 3VEU, 3VF3, 3VG1, 3VV6, 3VV7, 3ZMG, 3ZOV, 4ACU, 4ACX, 4AZY, 4B00, 4B05, 4B0Q, 4B1C, 4B1D, 4B1E, 4B70, 4B72, 4B77, 4B78, 4BEK, 4BFD, 4D83, 4D85, 4D88, 4D89, 4D8C, 4DH6, 4DI2, 4DJU, 4DJV, 4DJW, 4DJX, 4DJY, 4DPF, 4DPI, 4DUS, 4DV9, 4DVF, 4EWO, 4EXG, 4FCO, 4FGX, 4FM7, 4FM8, 4FRI, 4FRJ, 4FRK, 4FRS, 4FS4, 4FSE, 4FSL, 4GMI, 4H1E, 4H3F, 4H3G, 4H3I, 4H3J, 4HA5, 4HZT, 4I0E, 4I0F, 4I0G, 4I0H, 4I0J, 4I0Z, 4I10, 4I11, 4I12, 4I1C, 4J0T, 4J0V, 4J0Y, 4J0Z, 4J17, 4J1C, 4J1E, 4J1F, 4J1H, 4J1I, 4J1K, 4JOO, 4JP9, 4JPC, 4JPE, 4K8S, 4K9H, 4KE0, 4KE1, 3K5C, 3K5D, 3K5F, 3K5G, 3KMX, 3KMY, 3KN0, 3L58, 3L59, 3L5B, 3L5C, 3L5D, 3L5E, 3L5F, 3LPI, 3LPJ, 3LPK, 3OHF, 3OHH, 3PI5, 3QBH, 3R2F, 3RSX, 3RTH, 3RTN, 3RU1, 3SKF, 3SKG, 3U6A, 4GID, 4LXA, 4LXK, 4LXM, 3WB4, 3WB5, 4I0D, 4I0I, 4IVS, 4IVT, 4J0P, 4L7G, 4L7H, 4L7J, 4LC7, 4N00, 4PZW, 4PZX, 4R5N, 4R8Y, 4R91, 4R92, 4R93, 4R95, 4RCD, 4RCE, 4RCF, 4RRN, 4RRO, 4RRS, 4WY1, 4WY6, 4X2L, 4X7I, 4XKX, 4XXS, 4YBI, 4TRW, 4TRZ, 4ZSM, 4ZSP, 4ZSQ, 4ZSR, 4TRY, 4ZPF, 4ZPG, 5CLM, 5F01, 5EZZ, 5DQC, 5F00, 5EZX, 5HE7, 5HD0, 5HDX, 5HDV, 5HE5, 5HE4, 5HDU, 5HDZ, 5I3X, 5I3W, 5I3V, 5IE1, 5I3Y, 5ENK
Enzyme activity
EC #	BRENDA	ExPASy	KEGG	MetaCyc
3.4.23.46	↗	↗	↗	↗

Gene location (Human)
Chr.	Chromosome 11 (human)
Band	11q23.3	Start	117,285,232 bp
Band	11q23.3	End	117,316,259 bp

Gene location (Mouse)
Chr.	Chromosome 9 (mouse)
Band	9|9 A5.2	Start	45,749,878 bp
Band	9|9 A5.2	End	45,775,697 bp
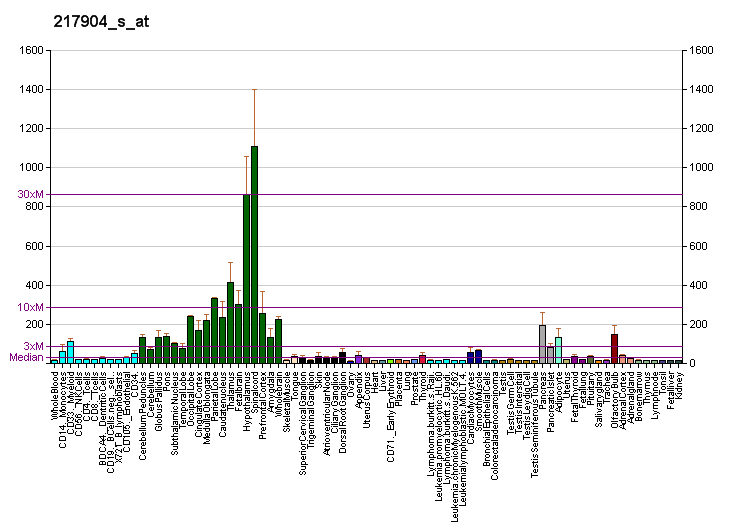
RNA expression pattern
Bgee	Human / Mouse (ortholog); Top expressed in: inferior ganglion of vagus nerve; body of pancreas; C1 segment; corpus callosum; stromal cell of endometrium; subthalamic nucleus; medulla oblongata; ventral tegmental area; inferior olivary nucleus; superior vestibular nucleus / Top expressed in: external carotid artery; internal carotid artery; Rostral migratory stream; medullary collecting duct; epithelium of lens; facial motor nucleus; vas deferens; ciliary body; anterior horn of spinal cord; renal corpuscle; More reference expression data
BioGPS	More reference expression data
Gene ontology
Molecular function	endopeptidase activity; amyloid-beta binding; beta-aspartyl-peptidase activity; protein binding; enzyme binding; hydrolase activity; peptidase activity; aspartic-type endopeptidase activity
Cellular component	multivesicular body; late endosome; endoplasmic reticulum lumen; membrane; plasma membrane; cell surface; axon; endoplasmic reticulum; Golgi-associated vesicle lumen; endosome membrane; cytoplasmic vesicle membrane; cytoplasmic vesicle; integral component of plasma membrane; membrane raft; Golgi apparatus; integral component of membrane; endosome; trans-Golgi network; lysosome; early endosome; synaptic vesicle; dendrite; soma; recycling endosome; hippocampal mossy fiber to CA3 synapse; presynapse
Biological process	protein catabolic process; proteolysis; amyloid-beta metabolic process; membrane protein ectodomain proteolysis; modulation of chemical synaptic transmission; response to radiation; response to lead ion; positive regulation of neuron apoptotic process; detection of mechanical stimulus involved in sensory perception of pain; prepulse inhibition; cellular response to copper ion; cellular response to manganese ion; cellular response to amyloid-beta; regulation of synaptic vesicle exocytosis
Sources:Amigo / QuickGO
Orthologs
Databases	NCBI: entry; OMA: entry
Species	Human	Mouse
Entrez	23621	23821
Ensembl	ENSG00000186318	ENSMUSG00000032086
UniProt	P56817	P56818
RefSeq (mRNA)	NM_138973; NM_001207048; NM_001207049; NM_012104; NM_138971 NM_138972	NM_001145947; NM_011792
RefSeq (protein)	NP_001193977; NP_001193978; NP_036236; NP_620427; NP_620428 NP_620429; NP_036236.1	NP_001139419; NP_035922
Location (UCSC)	Chr 11: 117.29 – 117.32 Mb	Chr 9: 45.75 – 45.78 Mb
PubMed search
- Wikidata
View/Edit Human	View/Edit Mouse

Beta-secretase 1, also known as beta-site amyloid precursor protein cleaving enzyme 1, beta-site APP cleaving enzyme 1 (BACE1), membrane-associated aspartic protease 2, memapsin-2, aspartyl protease 2, and ASP2, is an enzyme that in humans is encoded by the BACE1 gene. Expression of BACE1 is observed mainly in neurons and oligodendrocytes.

BACE1 is an aspartic acid protease important in the formation of myelin sheaths in peripheral nerve cells: in mice the expression of BACE1 is high in the postnatal stages, when myelination occurs. The transmembrane protein contains two active site aspartate residues in its extracellular protein domain and may function as a dimer, its cytoplasmic tail is required for the correct maturation and an efficient intracellular trafficking, but does not affect the activity. It is produced as a pro-enzyme, the endoproteolitc removal occurs after BACE leaves endoplasmic reticulum, in the Golgi apparatus. In addition the pro-peptide receives additional sugars to increase the molecular mass. and the tail became a palmitoylated.

The BACE1 expression is influenced by the inflammatory state: during AD the cytokines reduce the PPAR1 an inhibitor of BACE1 mRNA.

== Role in Alzheimer's disease ==
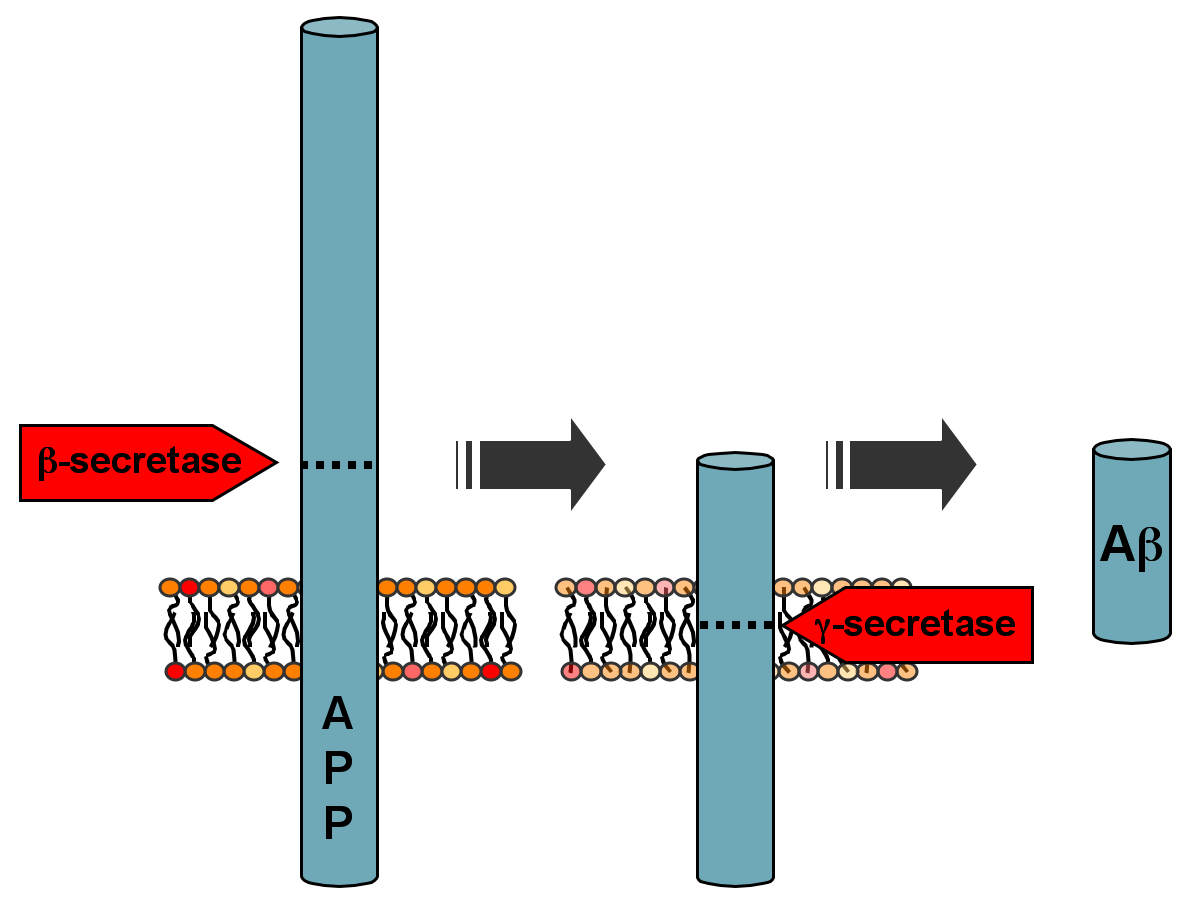
Processing of the amyloid precursor protein

BACE1 is the major beta secretase for the generation of amyloid-β peptides in neurons.

Generation of the 40 or 42 amino acid-long amyloid-β peptides that aggregate in the brain of Alzheimer's patients requires two sequential cleavages of the amyloid precursor protein (APP). Extracellular cleavage of APP by BACE1 creates a soluble extracellular fragment and a cell membrane-bound fragment referred to as C99. Cleavage of C99 within its transmembrane domain by γ-secretase releases the intracellular domain of APP and produces amyloid-β. Since gamma-secretase cleaves APP closer to the cell membrane than BACE1 does, it removes a fragment of the amyloid-β peptide. Initial cleavage of APP by α-secretase rather than BACE1 prevents eventual generation of amyloid-β, forming P3, this demonstrates that BACE1 and Alpha secretase compete for the APP processing.

Unlike APP and the presenilin proteins important in γ-secretase, no known mutations in the gene encoding BACE1 cause early-onset, familial Alzheimer's disease, which is a rare form of the disorder. However, levels of this enzyme have been shown to be elevated in the far more common late-onset sporadic Alzheimer's. BACE2 is a close homolog of BACE1 with no reported APP cleavage in vivo.

The physiological purpose of BACE's cleavage of APP and other transmembrane proteins is unknown: some studies observed that BACE1 is involved in myelination (it is co-express with neuregulin 1 type III). In a manner analogous to APP processing, the VGSC subunit beta is a substrate for BACE1.

However a single residue mutation in APP reduces the ability of BACE1 to cleave it to produce amyloid-beta and reduces the risk of Alzheimer's disease and other cognitive declines.

== BACE inhibitors ==
Drugs to block this enzyme (BACE inhibitors) in theory would prevent the buildup of beta-amyloid and (per the Amyloid hypothesis) may help slow or stop Alzheimer's disease.

=== For Alzheimer's disease ===
Several companies are in the early stages of development and testing of this potential class of treatment. In March 2008 phase I results were reported for CoMentis Inc's candidate CTS-21166.

In April 2012 Merck & Co., Inc reported phase I results for its candidate verubecestat (MK-8931). Merck began a Phase II/III trial of MK-8931 in December, 2012 estimated to be completed in July 2019. In February 2017, Merck halted its late-stage trial of verubecestat for mild to moderate Alzheimer's disease after it was reported as having "virtually no chance" of working according to an independent panel of experts. This came just three months after Eli Lilly & Co. announced its own setback with solanezumab.

In September 2014 AstraZeneca and Eli Lilly and Company announced an agreement to codevelop lanabecestat (AZD3293). A pivotal Phase II/III clinical trial of lanabecestat started in late 2014, but was halted in 2018 before its planned conclusion due to poor results.

Another BACE1 inhibitor that has reached phase II trials is the Eli Lilly's inhibitor LY2886721. The data on phase I trial were first presented at the Alzheimer's Association International conference in 2012. Daily dosing during 2 weeks, reduced BACE1 activity by 50–75% and CSF Aβ42 by 72% (Willis et al., 2012; Bowman Rogers and Strobel, 2013). Recently, Lilly reported that the phase II trial of LY2886721 was terminated due to liver abnormalities that were found in 4 out of 45 patients (Rogers, 2013). This toxicity, however, does not have to be related to the working mechanism of the inhibitor, but can represent off-target effects as the livers of BACE1 knockout mice are normal.

=== Potential side effects ===
Tests in mice have indicated that BACE proteases, specifically BACE1, are necessary for the proper function of muscle spindles. These results raise the possibility that BACE inhibiting drugs currently being investigated for the treatment of Alzheimer's may have significant side effects related to impaired motor coordination, though BACE1 knockout mice are healthy.

== Relationship to plasmepsin ==
BACE1 is distantly related to the pathogenic aspartic-acid protease plasmepsin, which is a potential target for future anti-malarial drugs.
