= Omptin =

Identifiers
- Symbol: Omptin
- Pfam: PF01278
- Pfam clan: CL0193
- PROSITE: PDOC00657
- MEROPS: A26
- SCOP2: 1i78 / SCOPe / SUPFAM
- OPM superfamily: 27
- OPM protein: 2x55
Available protein structures:
- PDB: PF01278 (ECOD; PDBsum)
- AlphaFold: PF01278

Omptins (EC 3.4.23.49, protease VII, protease A, gene ompT proteins, ompT protease, protein a, Pla, OmpT) are a family of bacterial proteases. They are aspartate proteases, which cleave peptides with the use of a water molecule. They are found in the outer membrane of gram-negative enterobacteria such as Shigella flexneri, Yersinia pestis, Escherichia coli, and Salmonella enterica. Omptins consist of a widely conserved beta barrel spanning the membrane with five extracellular loops. These loops are responsible for the various substrate specificities. These proteases rely upon binding of lipopolysaccharide for activity.

Omptins have been linked to bacterial pathogenesis.

== Background ==
Omptins, a group of membrane-bound proteins, are found in various organisms, including animals and plants, and particularly on the surface of certain bacteria, notably within the enterobacterial family. Known for their specificity in cleaving peptide bonds between adjacent basic amino acids, omptins serve dual functions as both proteases (enzymes that break down proteins) and adhesins (proteins that help cells stick together). Omptin genes are also associated with plasmids or prophages, indicating a potential role of horizontal gene transfer in the dissemination of these genes. This means that omptin genes may be transferred between different bacterial cells or even between species through mechanisms like plasmid transfer or the integration of prophages into bacterial genomes. Omptin protease activity is triggered under conditions of low magnesium growth. This characteristic is named after the prototypical OmpT protein, which features a 10-stranded β-barrel structure. The ability of genes to move horizontally between different organisms can contribute to the spread of advantageous traits, such as those involved in host-pathogen interactions or other cellular processes. In the case of omptins, understanding their genetic context and the mechanisms of horizontal gene transfer can provide insights into their evolution and the diversity of organisms that harbor these genes.

== Structure ==
Omptin proteins possess a structural composition featuring a B-barrel fold, an active site, catalytic residues, a lipopolysaccharide (LPS) binding site, and a multiplicity of elements. Despite their shared structural features, each individual omptin serves distinct functions. These proteins play a role in the lifestyle of bacteria and are associated with the mechanisms by which bacterial species cause disease. The structure of omptins is like a cylinder with four catalytic residues located on its outer surface. Initially classified as serine proteases, they were later recognized as aspartate proteases based on the crystal structure of OmpT. Omptins stand out because they exhibit characteristics of both serine and aspartate proteases. Members of this protein family share a significant sequence identity at the amino acid level, ranging from 40% to 80%. omptins like OmpT and Pla have very similar folding patterns.

== Function ==
Omptins become active when they interact with a lipopolysaccharide molecule. They primarily cleave protein or peptide substrates between specific basic amino acid residues, serving as a defense against antimicrobial peptides that could disrupt the lipopolysaccharide network. These proteases target a variety of host substrates, and when lipopolysaccharide binds, it subtly alters the shape of the active site, activating the omptins. The expression of omptins is under the regulation of a factor called PhoP.

Certain omptins, such as those cutting ArlC and CroP, exhibit high resistance to serum. Within the Enterobacteriaceae family, bacteria produce proteases that can target components of the host's innate immune system. Omptin proteases function as a defense mechanism against antimicrobial peptides and are governed by PhoPQ. PhoP directly binds to specific gene sites, determining omptin activity. For omptins to be active in breaking down proteins, they need to bind to lipopolysaccharide as a cofactor.

Beyond their role in resisting antimicrobial peptides, omptins are involved in processing and secreting parts of bacterial auto transporters and breaking down host proteins. Pla, a specific omptin, can activate plasminogen through limited proteolysis. This activation is thought to assist the organism in escaping from a meshwork of fibrin, facilitating its spread through tissues outside blood vessels. Pla also possesses the capability to activate plasminogen through limited proteolysis. This function is believed to aid the organism in escaping from the fibrin meshwork, thereby facilitating its dissemination through extravascular tissues.

== Bacterial functions and locations ==
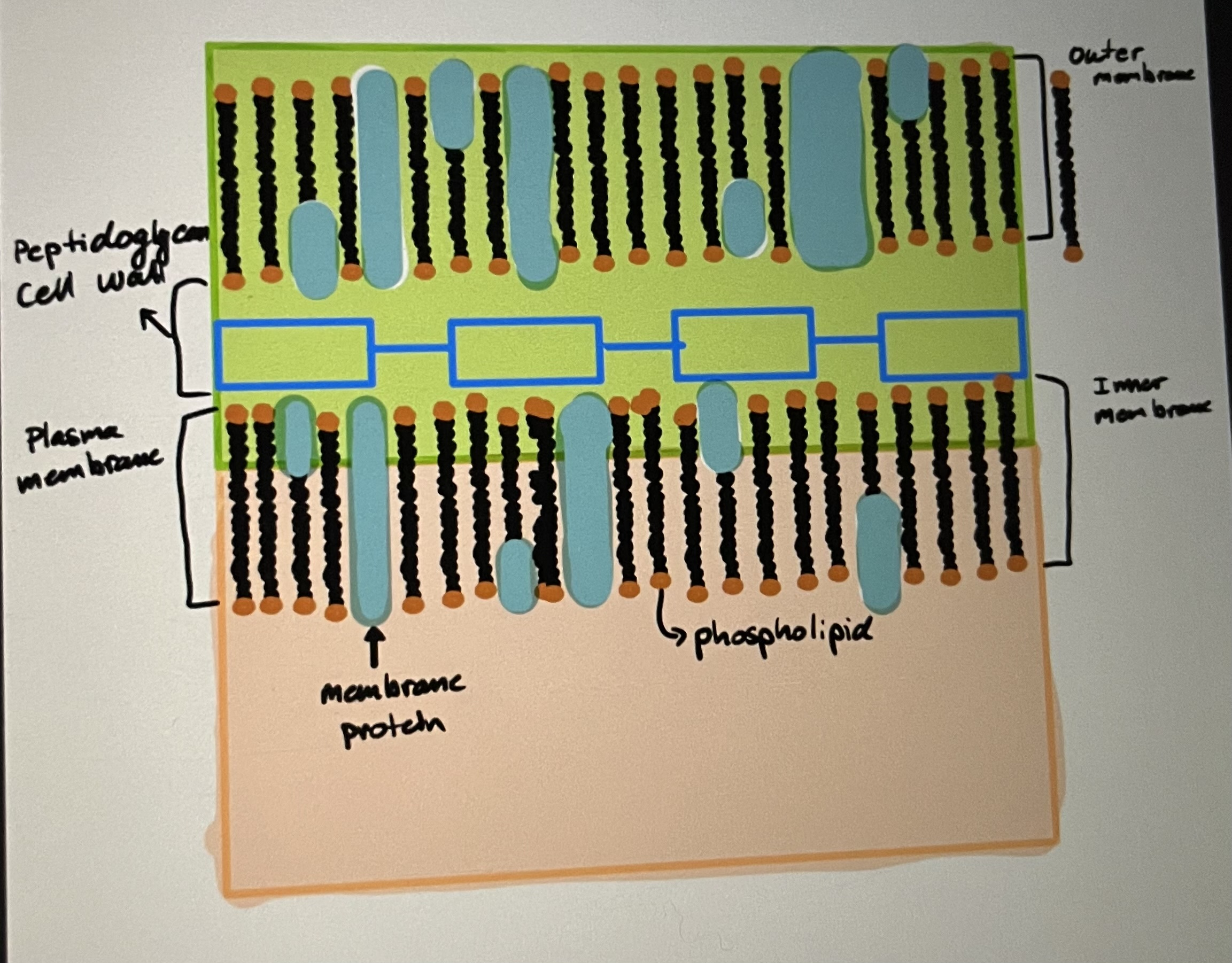
Outer Membrane of Gram Negative Bacteria

Omptin outer membrane proteins are found in select Gram-negative bacteria, including members of the Enterobacteriaceae family like E. coli (OmpT), Yersinia pestis (Pla), Salmonella enterica (PgtE), Shigella flexneri (IcsP), and Citrobacter rodentium (CroP). The Omptin family encompasses outer membrane proteases such as OmpT in E. coli and Ola in Salmonella. In E. coli, Omptin proteins like OmpT, OmpP, and ArlC can be identified, and all possess the ability to cleave antimicrobial peptides. These Omptin proteases are commonly grouped into OmpT or Pla families, with Pla Omptins demonstrating higher efficacy in cleaving or activating plasminogen compared to OmpT. Omptins, such as Pla and PgtE, disrupt innate immunity by influencing various systems, including plasminogen/plasmin, complement, coagulation, fibrinolysis, and matrix metalloproteinase systems. They achieve this by inactivating antimicrobial peptides, resulting in an enhanced spread and multiplication of Pla and PgtE. On the other hand, OmpT functions as a housekeeping protease, playing a role in degrading cationic antimicrobial peptides and augmenting E. coli capabilities. OmpT proteases are implicated in the cleavage of antimicrobial peptides, and an escalation in Omptin activity is closely linked to clinical UPEC strains isolated from individuals with urinary tract infections. The variability in activity is associated with diverse expressions of OmpT and ArlC in E. coli, with the presence of ArlC potentially accounting for the observed diversity in activity. This heightened Omptin activity is specifically identified with UPEC strains responsible for urinary tract infections
