= Pepsin =

Enzyme

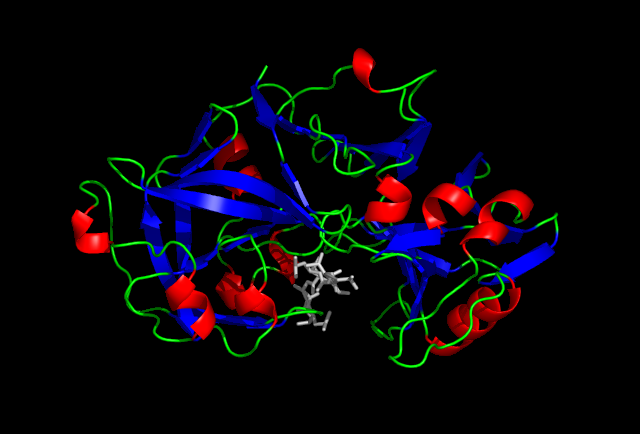
- Pepsin in complex with pepstatin.

Identifiers
- EC no.: 3.4.23.1
- CAS no.: 9001-75-6

Databases
- BRENDA: enzyme data
- ExPASy: NiceZyme view
- KEGG: enzyme entry
- MetaCyc: metabolic pathway
- Rhea: reactions
- PDB structures: RCSB PDB PDBe PDBsum
- Gene Ontology: AmiGO / QuickGO
Search
- PMC: articles
- PubMed: articles
- NCBI: proteins

pepsin B

Identifiers
- EC no.: 3.4.23.2
- CAS no.: 9025-48-3

Databases
- BRENDA: enzyme data
- ExPASy: NiceZyme view
- KEGG: enzyme entry
- MetaCyc: metabolic pathway
- Rhea: reactions
- PDB structures: RCSB PDB PDBe PDBsum
Search
- PMC: articles
- PubMed: articles
- NCBI: proteins

pepsin C (gastricsin)

Identifiers
- EC no.: 3.4.23.3
- CAS no.: 9012-71-9

Databases
- BRENDA: enzyme data
- ExPASy: NiceZyme view
- KEGG: enzyme entry
- MetaCyc: metabolic pathway
- Rhea: reactions
- PDB structures: RCSB PDB PDBe PDBsum
Search
- PMC: articles
- PubMed: articles
- NCBI: proteins

Pepsin /ˈpɛpsɪn/ is an endopeptidase that breaks down proteins into smaller peptides and amino acids. It is one of the main digestive enzymes in the digestive systems of humans and many other animals, where it helps digest the proteins in food. Pepsin is an aspartic protease having a catalytic aspartate in its active site.

Pepsin is one of three endopeptidases (enzymes cleaving proteins in the middle) in the human digestive system, including chymotrypsin and trypsin. There are also exopeptidases which remove individual amino acids at both ends of proteins (carboxypeptidases produced by the pancreas and aminopeptidases secreted by the small intestine). During digestion, these enzymes, each of which is specialized in severing bonds between particular types of amino acids, collaborate to break down dietary proteins into their component peptides and amino acids, which can be readily absorbed by the small intestine. The cleavage specificity of pepsin is broad, but some amino acids like tyrosine, phenylalanine and tryptophan increase the probability of cleavage.

The zymogen pepsinogen is secreted by the gastric chief cells in the stomach wall, and upon mixing with the hydrochloric acid in gastric juice, pepsinogen converts to pepsin.

== History ==
Pepsin was one of the first enzymes to be discovered by Theodor Schwann in 1836. Schwann coined its name from the Greek word πέψις pepsis, meaning "digestion" (from πέπτειν peptein "to digest"). An acidic substance that was able to convert nitrogen-based foods into water-soluble material was determined to be pepsin.

In 1928, it became one of the first enzymes to be crystallized when John H. Northrop crystallized it using dialysis, filtration, and cooling.

== Precursor ==
Pepsin is expressed as a zymogen called pepsinogen, whose primary structure has an additional 44 amino acids compared to the active enzyme.

In the stomach, gastric chief cells release pepsinogen. This zymogen is activated by hydrochloric acid (HCl), which is released from parietal cells in the stomach lining. The hormone gastrin and the vagus nerve trigger the release of both pepsinogen and HCl from the stomach lining when food is ingested. Hydrochloric acid creates an acidic environment, which allows pepsinogen to unfold and cleave itself in an autocatalytic fashion, thereby generating pepsin (the active form). Pepsin cleaves the 44 amino acids from pepsinogen to create more pepsin.

Pepsinogens are of 5 different groups based on their primary structure: pepsinogen A (also called pepsinogen I), pepsinogen B, progastricsin (also called pepsinogen II and pepsinogen C), prochymosin (also called prorennin) and pepsinogen F (also called pregnancy-associated glycoprotein).

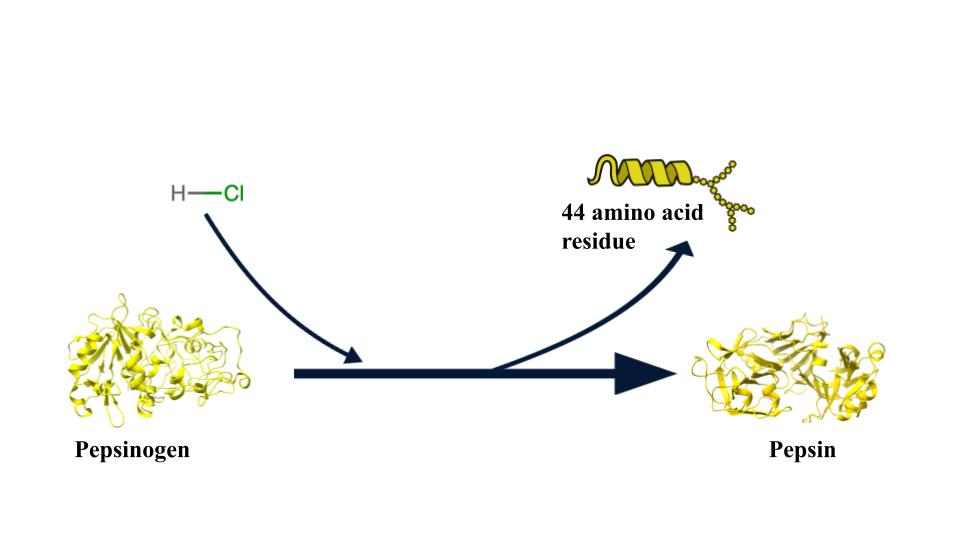
The conversion of the inactive Pepsinogen into the active enzyme Pepsin via activation with Hydrochloric Acid.

== Activity and stability ==
Pepsin is most active in acidic environments between pH 1.5 to 2.5. Accordingly, its primary site of synthesis and activity is in the stomach (pH 1.5 to 2). In humans the concentration of pepsin in the stomach reaches 0.5 – 1 mg/mL.

Pepsin is inactive at pH 6.5 and above; however, pepsin is not fully denatured or irreversibly inactivated until pH 8.0. Therefore, pepsin in solutions of up to pH 8.0 can be reactivated upon re-acidification. The stability of pepsin at high pH has significant implications on disease attributed to laryngopharyngeal reflux. Pepsin remains in the larynx following a gastric reflux event. At the mean pH of the laryngopharynx (pH = 6.8) pepsin would be inactive but could be reactivated upon subsequent acid reflux events resulting in damage to local tissues.

Pepsin exhibits a broad cleavage specificity. Pepsin will digest up to 20% of ingested amide bonds. Residues in the P1 and P1' positions are most important in determining cleavage probability. Generally, hydrophobic amino acids at P1 and P1' positions increase cleavage probability. Phenylalanine, leucine and methionine at the P1 position, and phenylalanine, tryptophan and tyrosine at the P1' position result in the highest cleavage probability. Cleavage is disfavoured by positively charged amino acids histidine, lysine and arginine at the P1 position.

== In laryngopharyngeal reflux ==
Pepsin is one of the primary causes of mucosal damage during laryngopharyngeal reflux. Pepsin remains in the larynx (pH 6.8) following a gastric reflux event. While enzymatically inactive in this environment, pepsin would remain stable and could be reactivated upon subsequent acid reflux events. Exposure of laryngeal mucosa to enzymatically active pepsin, but not irreversibly inactivated pepsin or acid, results in reduced expression of protective proteins and thereby increases laryngeal susceptibility to damage.

Pepsin may also cause mucosal damage during weakly acidic or non-acid gastric reflux. Weak or non-acid reflux is correlated with reflux symptoms and mucosal injury. Under non-acid conditions (neutral pH), pepsin is internalized by cells of the upper airways such as the larynx and hypopharynx by a process known as receptor-mediated endocytosis. The receptor by which pepsin is endocytosed is currently unknown. Upon cellular uptake, pepsin is stored in intracellular vesicles of low pH at which its enzymatic activity would be restored. Pepsin is retained within the cell for up to 24 hours. Such exposure to pepsin at neutral pH and endocyctosis of pepsin causes changes in gene expression associated with inflammation, which underlies signs and symptoms of reflux, and tumor progression. This and other research implicates pepsin in carcinogenesis attributed to gastric reflux.

Pepsin in airway specimens is considered to be a sensitive and specific marker for laryngopharyngeal reflux. Research to develop new pepsin-targeted therapeutic and diagnostic tools for gastric reflux is ongoing. A rapid non-invasive pepsin diagnostic called Peptest is now available which determines the presence of pepsin in saliva samples.

== Inhibitors ==
Pepsin may be inhibited by high pH (see Activity and stability) or by inhibitor compounds. Pepstatin is a low molecular weight compound and potently inhibitor specific for acid proteases with an inhibitory dissociation constant (Ki) of about 10^{−10} M for pepsin. The statyl residue of pepstatin is thought to be responsible for pepstatin inhibition of pepsin; statine is a potential analog of the transition state for catalysis by pepsin and other acid proteases. Pepstatin does not covalently bind pepsin, and inhibition of pepsin by pepstatin is therefore reversible. 1-bis(diazoacetyl)-2-phenylethane reversibly inactivates pepsin at pH 5, a reaction which is accelerated by the presence of Cu(II).

Porcine pepsin is inhibited by pepsin inhibitor-3 (PI-3) produced by the large roundworm of pig (Ascaris suum). PI-3 occupies the active site of pepsin using its N-terminal residues and thereby blocks substrate binding. Amino acid residues 1 - 3 (Gln-Phe-Leu) of mature PI-3 bind to P1' - P3' positions of pepsin. The N-terminus of PI-3 in the PI-3:pepsin complex is positioned by hydrogen bonds which form an eight-stranded β-sheet, where three strands are contributed by pepsin and five by PI-3.

A product of protein digestion by pepsin inhibits the reaction.

Sucralfate, a drug used to treat stomach ulcers and other pepsin-related conditions, also inhibits pepsin activity.

== Applications ==
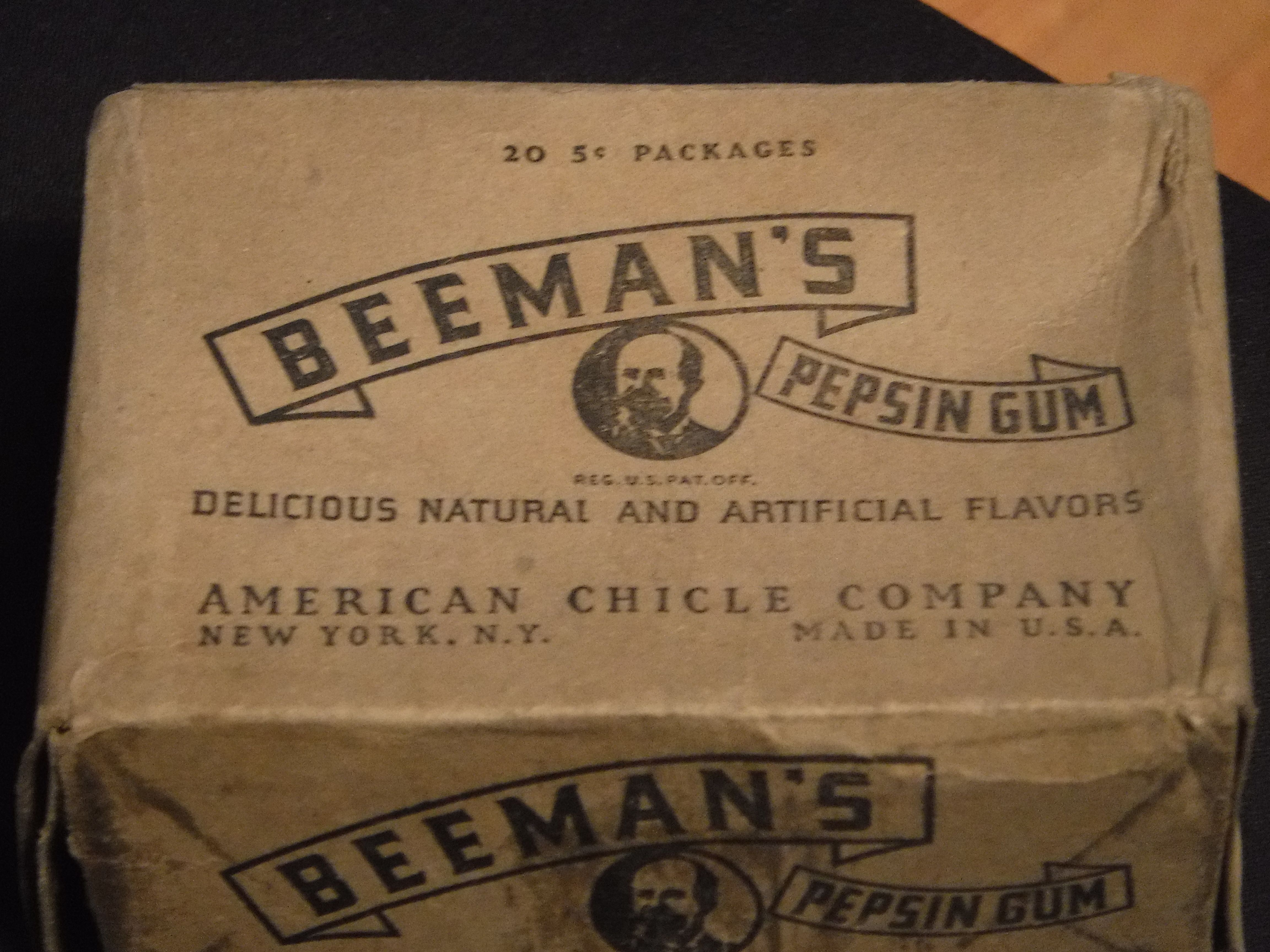
Beeman's Pepsin Gum

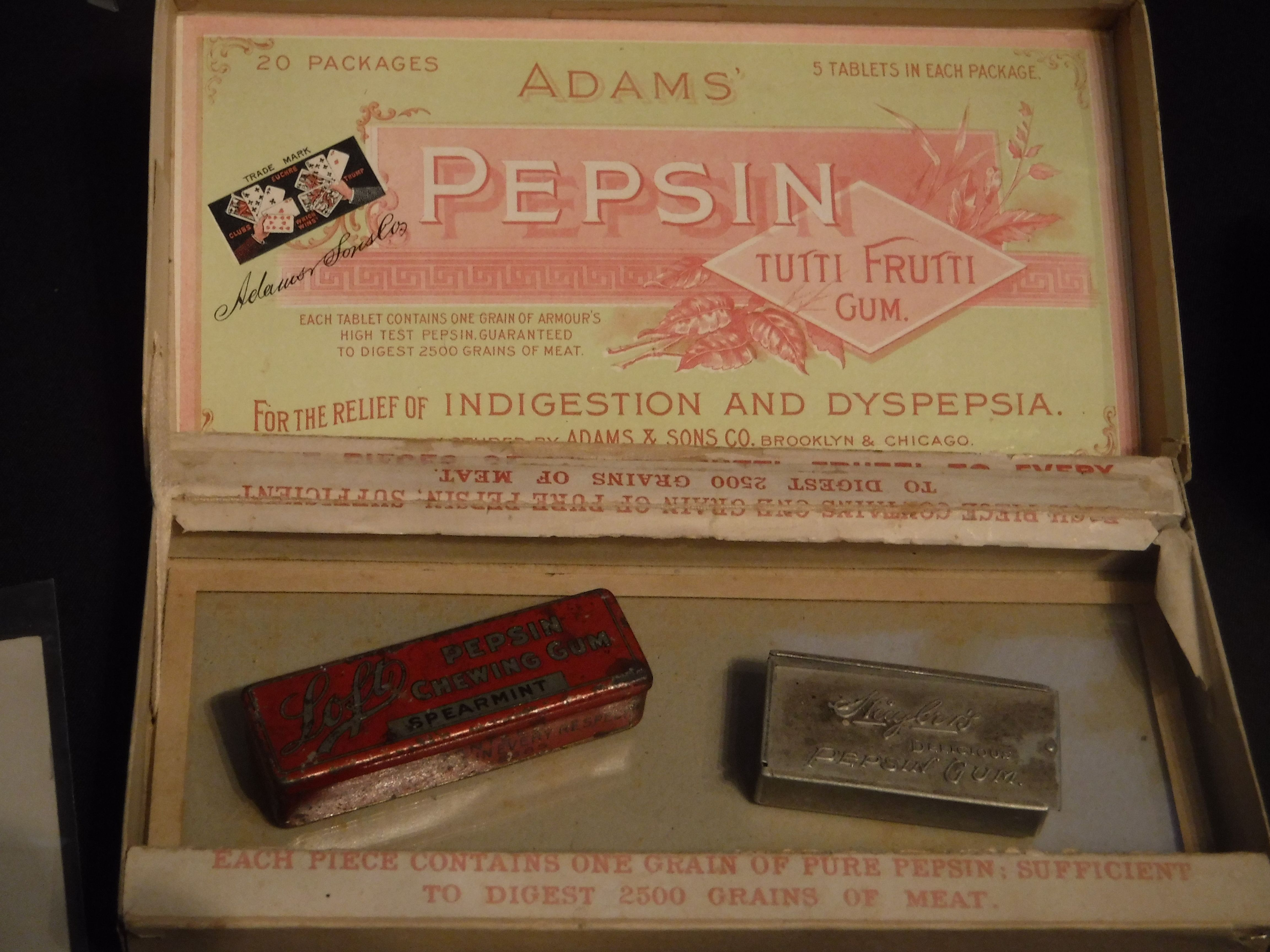
Adams Pepsin Tutti Frutti Gum, marketed "For relief of indigestion and dyspepsia"

Commercial pepsin is extracted from the glandular layer of hog stomachs. It is a component of rennet used to curdle milk during the manufacture of cheese. Pepsin is used for a variety of applications in food manufacturing: to modify and provide whipping qualities to soy protein and gelatin, to modify vegetable proteins for use in nondairy snack items, to make precooked cereals into instant hot cereals, and to prepare animal and vegetable protein hydrolysates for use in flavoring foods and beverages. It is used in the leather industry to remove hair and residual tissue from hides and in the recovery of silver from discarded photographic films by digesting the gelatin layer that holds the silver. Pepsin was historically an additive of Beemans chewing gum by Dr. Edwin E. Beeman. The namesake of Pepsodent came from pepsin, designed to break down and digest food deposits on the teeth. Pepsin was an ingredient used in early Pepsodent toothpaste.

Pepsin is commonly used in the preparation of F(ab')2 fragments from antibodies. In some assays, it is preferable to use only the antigen-binding (Fab) portion of the antibody. For these applications, antibodies may be enzymatically digested to produce either an Fab or an F(ab')2 fragment of the antibody. To produce an F(ab')2 fragment, IgG is digested with pepsin, which cleaves the heavy chains near the hinge region. One or more of the disulfide bonds that join the heavy chains in the hinge region are preserved, so the two Fab regions of the antibody remain joined together, yielding a divalent molecule (containing two antibody binding sites), hence the designation F(ab')2. The light chains remain intact and attached to the heavy chain. The Fc fragment is digested into small peptides. Fab fragments are generated by cleavage of IgG with papain instead of pepsin. Papain cleaves IgG above the hinge region containing the disulfide bonds that join the heavy chains, but below the site of the disulfide bond between the light chain and heavy chain. This generates two separate monovalent (containing a single antibody binding site) Fab fragments and an intact Fc fragment. The fragments can be purified by gel filtration, ion exchange, or affinity chromatography.

Fab and F(ab')2 antibody fragments are used in assay systems where the presence of the Fc region may cause problems. In tissues such as lymph nodes or spleen, or in peripheral blood preparations, cells with Fc receptors (macrophages, monocytes, B lymphocytes, and natural killer cells) are present, which can bind the Fc region of intact antibodies, causing background staining in areas that do not contain the target antigen. Use of F(ab')2 or Fab fragments ensures that the antibodies are binding to the antigen and not Fc receptors. These fragments may also be desirable for staining cell preparations in the presence of plasma, because they are not able to bind complement, which could lyse the cells. F(ab')2, and to a greater extent Fab, fragments allow more exact localization of the target antigen, i.e., in staining tissue for electron microscopy. The divalency of the F(ab')2 fragment enables it to cross-link antigens, allowing use for precipitation assays, cellular aggregation via surface antigens, or rosetting assays. (Pepsi)

== Genes ==
The following three genes encode identical human pepsinogen A enzymes:

pepsinogen 3, group I (pepsinogen A)

Identifiers
- Symbol: PGA3
- NCBI gene: 643834
- HGNC: 8885
- OMIM: 169710
- RefSeq: NM_001079807
- UniProt: P00790

Other data
- EC number: 3.4.23.1
- Locus: Chr. 11 q13
Search for
- Structures: Swiss-model
- Domains: InterPro

pepsinogen 4, group I (pepsinogen A)

Identifiers
- Symbol: PGA4
- NCBI gene: 643847
- HGNC: 8886
- OMIM: 169720
- RefSeq: NM_001079808
- UniProt: P00790

Other data
- EC number: 3.4.23.1
- Locus: Chr. 11 q13
Search for
- Structures: Swiss-model
- Domains: InterPro

pepsinogen 5, group I (pepsinogen A)

Identifiers
- Symbol: PGA5
- NCBI gene: 5222
- HGNC: 8887
- OMIM: 169730
- RefSeq: NM_014224
- UniProt: P00790

Other data
- EC number: 3.4.23.1
- Locus: Chr. 11 q13
Search for
- Structures: Swiss-model
- Domains: InterPro

A fourth human gene encodes gastricsin also known as pepsinogen C:

progastricsin (pepsinogen C)

Identifiers
- Symbol: PGC
- NCBI gene: 5225
- HGNC: 8890
- OMIM: 169740
- RefSeq: NM_001166424
- UniProt: P20142

Other data
- EC number: 3.4.23.3
- Locus: Chr. 6 pter-p21.1
Search for
- Structures: Swiss-model
- Domains: InterPro
