= Adenylylation =

Post-translational modification

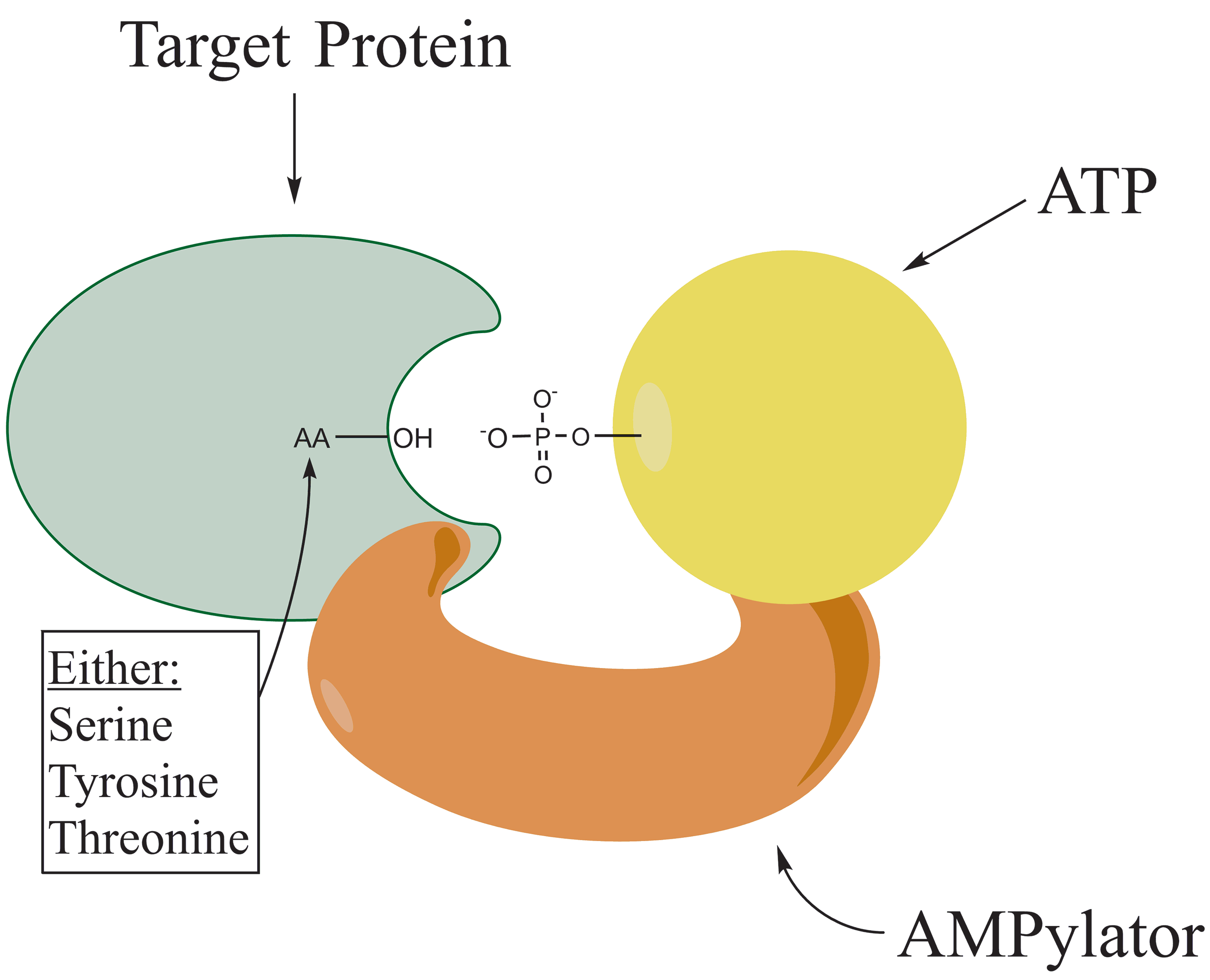
AMPylator setting up target protein with ATP for AMPylation reaction.

Adenylylation, more commonly known as AMPylation, is a process in which an adenosine monophosphate (AMP) molecule is covalently attached to the amino acid side chain of a protein. This covalent addition of AMP to a hydroxyl side chain of the protein is a post-translational modification. Adenylylation involves a phosphodiester bond between a hydroxyl group of the molecule undergoing adenylylation, and the phosphate group of the adenosine monophosphate nucleotide (i.e. adenylic acid). Enzymes that are capable of catalyzing this process are called AMPylators.

The known amino acids to be targeted in the protein are tyrosine and threonine, and sometimes serine. When charges on a protein undergo a change, it affects the characteristics of the protein, normally by altering its shape via interactions of the amino acids which make up the protein. AMPylation can have various effects on the protein. These are properties of the protein like, stability, enzymatic activity, co-factor binding, and many other functional capabilities of a protein. Another function of adenylylation is amino acids activation, which is catalyzed by tRNA aminoacyl synthetase. The most commonly identified protein to receive AMPylation are GTPases, and glutamine synthetase.

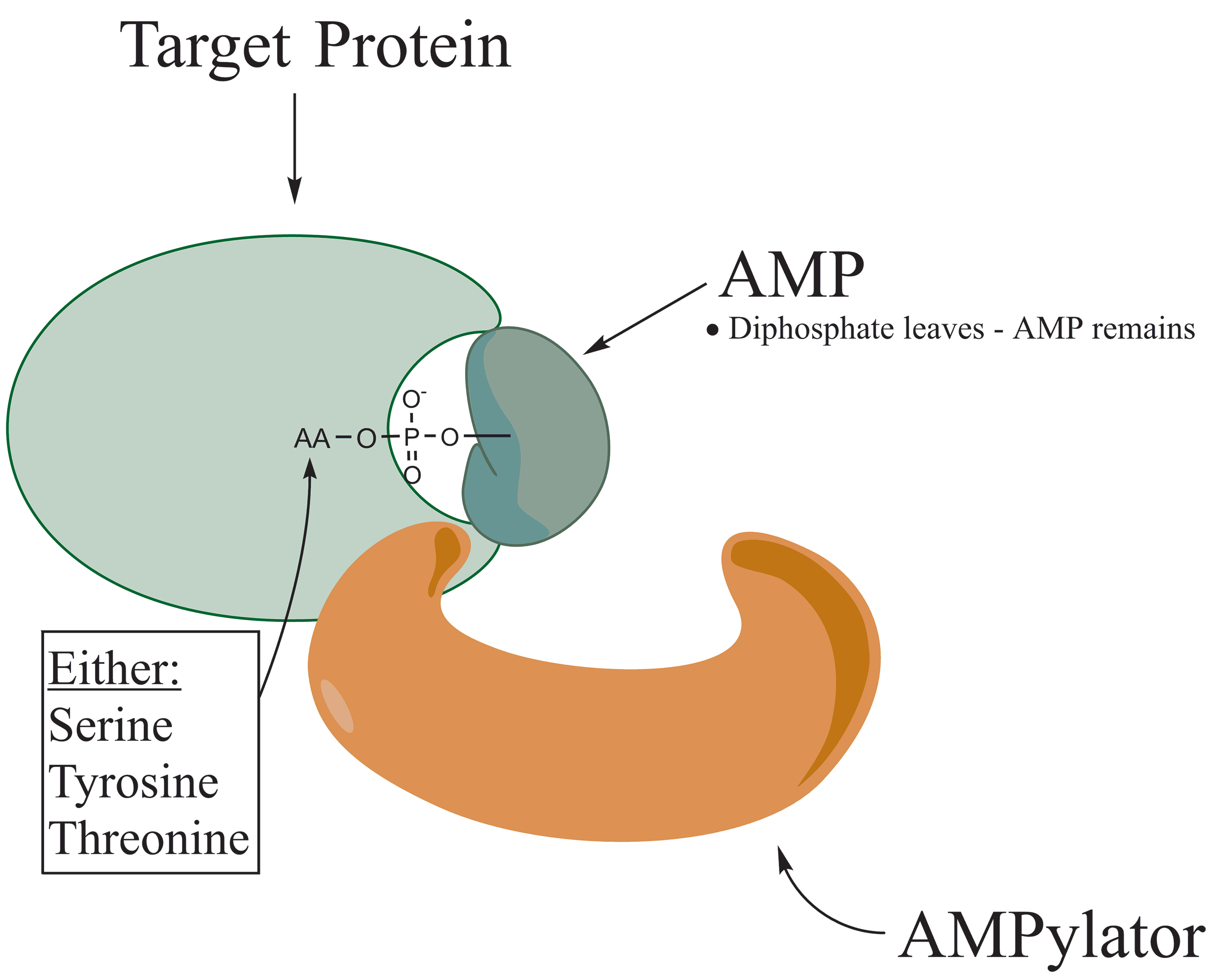
AMPylator having attached the ATP, now an AMP to the targeted protein, completing AMPylation.

== Adenylylators ==
Enzymes responsible for AMPylation, called AMPylators or Adenylyltransferase, fall into two different families, all depending on their structural properties and mechanism used. AMPylator is created by two catalytic homologous halves. One half is responsible for catalyzing the adenylylation reaction, while the other half catalyzes the phosphorolytic deadenylylation reaction. These two families are the DNA-β-polymerase-like and the Fic family.

DNA-β-polymerase-like, is a family of Nucleotidyltransferase. It more specifically is known as the GlnE family. There is a specific motif that is used to clarify this particular family. The motif consists of a three stranded β-sheet which is part of magnesium ion coordination and phosphate binding. Aspartate is essential for the activity to occur in this family.

The Fic domain belongs to Fido (Fic/Doc) superfamilyFic family, which is a filamentation induced by cyclic AMP domain, is known to perform AMPylation. This term was coined when VopS from Vibrio parahaemolyticus was discovered to modify RhoGTPases with AMP on a serine. This family of proteins are found in all domains of life on earth. It is mediated via a mechanism of ATP-binding-site alpha helix motif. Infectious bacteria use this domain to interrupt phagocytosis and cause cell death. Fic domains are evolutionarily conserved domains in prokaryotes and eukaryotes that belong to the Fido domain superfamily.

AMPylators have been shown to be comparable to kinases due to their ATP hydrolysis activity and reversible transfer of the metabolite to a hydroxyl side chain of the protein substrate. However, AMPylation catalyse a nucleophilic attack on the α-phosphate group, while kinase in the phosphorylation reaction targets γ-phosphate. The nucleophilic attack of AMPylation leads to release Pyrophosphate and the AMP-modified protein are the products of the AMPylation reaction.

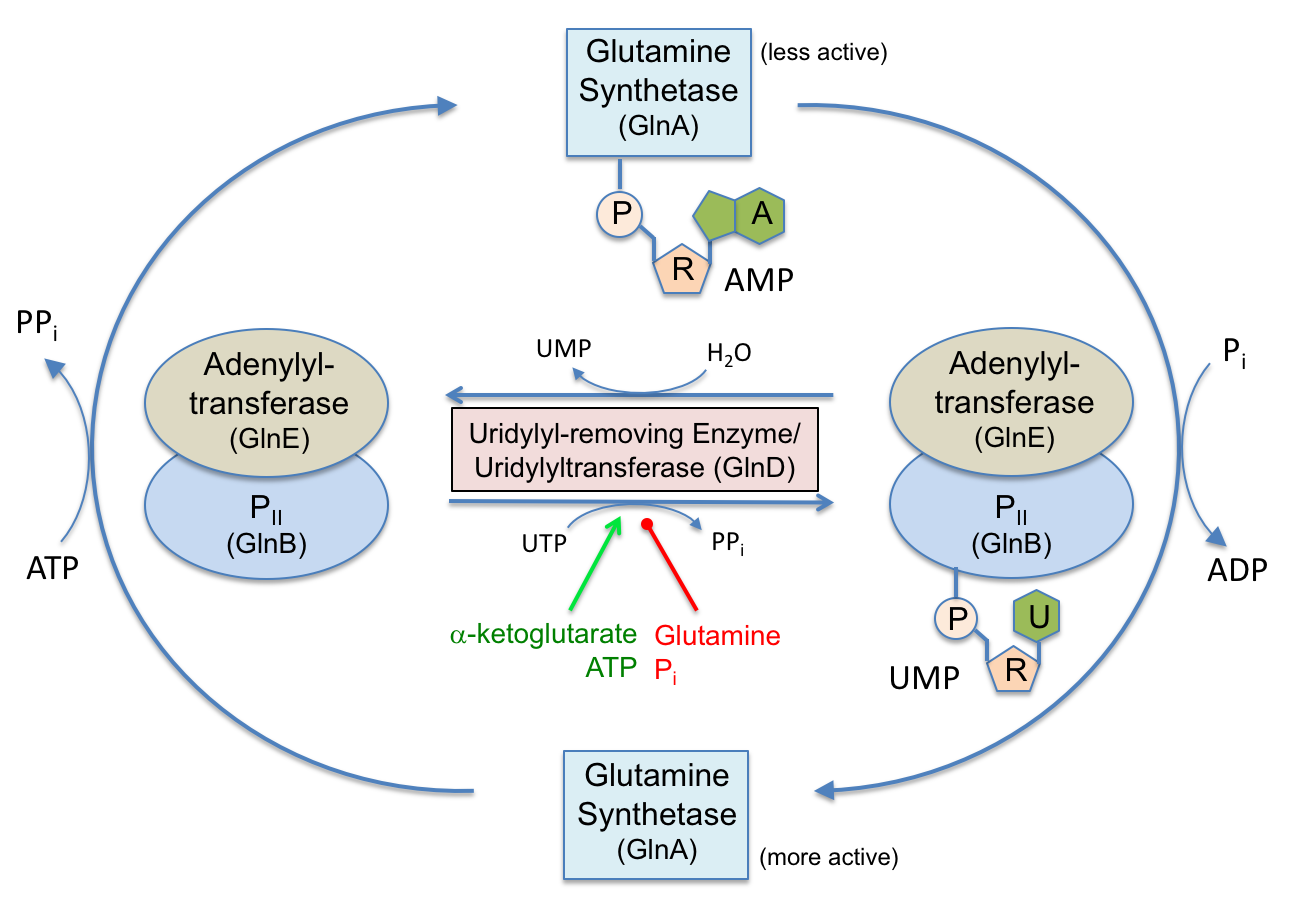
The regulation of P_{II} proteins in Glutamine Synthase ( the most example using AMPylation and DeAMPylation)

== De-adenylylators ==
De-AMPylation is the reverse reaction in which the AMP molecule is detached from the amino acid side of a chain protein.

There are three known mechanisms for this reaction. The bacterial GS-ATase (GlnE) encodes a bipartite protein with separate N-terminal AMPylation and C-terminal de-AMPylation domains whose activity is regulated by P_{II} and associated posttranslational modifications. De-AMPylation of its substrate AMPylated glutamine synthetase proceeds by a phosphorolytic reaction between the adenyl-tyrosine of GS and orthophosphate, leading to the formation of ADP and unmodified glutamine synthetase.

SidD, a protein introduced in the host cell by the pathogenic bacteria Legionella pneumophila, de-AMPylates Rab1 a host protein AMPylated by a different Legionella pneumophila enzyme, the AMPylase SidM. Whilst the benefit to the pathogen of introducing these two antagonistic effectors in the host remains unclear, the biochemical reaction carried out by SidD involves the use of a phosphatase-like domain to catalyse the hydrolytic removal of the AMP from tyrosine 77 of the host's Rab1.

In animal cells the removal of AMP from threonine 518 of BiP/Grp78 is catalysed by the same enzyme, FICD, that AMPylates BiP. Unlike the bacterial GS-ATase, FICD carries out both reactions with same catalytic domain.

== Adenylylation in Prokaryotes ==
=== Bacterial homeostasis ===
AMPylation is involved in bacterial homeostasis. The most famous example is AMPylator GS-ATase (GlnE), which contributes in complex regulation of nitrogen metabolism through AMPylation of glutamine synthetase that was introduced in the AMPylation and DeAMPylation parts.

Another example of AMPylators that play a role in bacterial homeostasis is the class I Fic AMPylators (FicT), which modifies the GyrB subunit of DNA gyrase, the conserved tyrosine residue for ATP binding of ParE subunit at Topoisomerase IV. This DNA gyrase inactivation by AMPylation leads to the activation of SOS response, which is the cellular response to DNA damage. The activity of FicT AMPylation is reversible and only leads to growth arrest, but not cell death. Therefore, FicT AMPylation plays a role in regulating cell stress, which is shown in the Wolbachia bacteria that the level of FicT increases in response to doxycycline.

A Class III Fic AMPylator NmFic of N. meningtidis is also found to modify AMPylate GyrB at the conserved tyrosine for ATP binding. This shows that Fic domains are highly conserved that indicates the important role of AMPylation in regulating cellular stress in bacteria. The regulation of NmFic involves the concentration-dependent monomerization and autoAMPylation for activation of NmFic activity.

=== Bacterial pathogenicity ===
Bacteria proteins, also known as effectors, have been shown to use AMPylation. Effectors such as VopS, IbpA, and DrrA, have been shown to AMPylate host GTPases and cause actin cytoskeleton changes. GTPases are common targets of AMPylators. Rho, Rab, and Arf GTPase families are involved in actin cytoskeleton dynamics and vesicular trafficking. They also play roles in cellular control mechanisms such as phagocytosis in the host cell.

The pathogen enhances or prevents its internalization by either inducing or inhibiting host cell phagocytosis. Vibrio parahaemolyticus is a Gram-negative bacterium that causes food poisoning as a result of raw or undercooked seafood consumption in humans. VopS, a type III effector found in Vibrio parahaemolyticus, contains a Fic domain that has a conserved HPFx(D/E)GN(G/K)R motif that contains a histidine residue essential for AMPylation. VopS blocks actin assembly by modifying threonine residue in the switch 1 region of Rho GTPases. The transfer of an AMP moiety using ATP to the threonine residue results in steric hindrance, and thus prevents Rho GTPases from interacting with downstream effectors. VopS also adenylates RhoA and cell division cycle 42 (CDC42), leading to a disaggregation of the actin filament network. As a result, the host cell's actin cytoskeleton control is disabled, leading to cell rounding.

IbpA is secreted into eukaryotic cells from H. somni, a Gram-negative bacterium in cattle that causes respiratory epithelium infection. This effector contains two Fic domains at the C-terminal region. AMPylation of the IbpA Fic domain of Rho family GTPases is responsible for its cytotoxicity. Both Fic domains have similar effects on host cells' cytoskeleton as VopS. The AMPylation on a tyrosine residue of the switch 1 region blocks the interaction of the GTPases with downstream substrates such as PAK.

DrrA is the Dot/Icm type IV translocation system substrate DrrA from Legionella pneumophila. It is the effector secreted by L. pneumophila to modify GTPases of the host cells. This modification increases the survival of bacteria in host cells. DrrA is composed of Rab1b specific guanine nucleotide exchange factor (GEF) domain, a C-terminal lipid binding domain and an N-terminal domain with unclear cytotoxic properties. Research works show that N-terminal and full-length DrrA shows AMPylators activity toward host's Rab1b protein (Ras related protein), which is also the substrate of Rab1b GEF domain. Rab1b protein is the GTPase Rab to regulate vesicle transportation and membrane fusion. The adenylation by bacteria AMPylators prolong GTP-bound state of Rab1b. Thus, the role of effector DrrA is connected toward the benefits of bacteria's vacuoles for their replication during the infection.

== Adenlylylation in Eukaryotes ==
Plants and yeasts have no known endogenous AMPylating enzymes, but animal genomes are endowed with a single copy of a gene encoding a Fic-domain AMPylase, that was likely acquired by an early ancestor of animals via horizontal gene transfer from a prokaryote. The human protein referred to commonly as FICD, had been previously identified as Huntingtin associated protein E (HypE; an assignment arising from a yeast two-hybrid screen, but of questionable relevance, as Huntingtin and HypE/FICD are localised to different cellular compartments). CG9523 Homologues in Drosophila melanogaster (CG9523) and C. elegans (Fic-1) have also received attention. In all animals FICD has a similar structure. It is a type II transmembrane domain protein, with a short cytoplasmic domain followed by membrane anchor that holds the protein in the endoplasmic reticulum (ER) and long C-terminal portion that resides in ER and encompasses tetratricopeptide repeats (TPRs) followed by a catalytic Fic domain.

=== Endoplasmic reticulum ===
The discovery of an animal cell AMPylase, followed by the discovery of its ER localisation and that BiP is a prominent substrate for its activity were important breakthroughs. BiP (also known as Grp78) had long been known to undergo an inactivating post-translational modification, but its nature remained elusive. Widely assumed to be ADP-ribosylation, it turns out to be FICD-mediated AMPylation, as inactivating the FICD gene in cells abolished all measurable post-translational modification of BiP.

BiP is an ER-localised protein chaperone whose activity is tightly regulated at the transcriptional level via a gene-expression program known as the Unfolded Protein Response (UPR). The UPR is a homeostatic process that couples the transcription rate of BiP (and many other proteins) to the burden of unfolded proteins in the ER (so-called ER stress) to help maintain ER proteostasis. AMPylation adds another rapid post-translational layer of control of BiP's activity, as modification of Thr518 of BiP's substrate-binding domain with an AMP locks the chaperone into an inactive conformation. This modification is selectively deployed as ER stress wanes, to inactivate surplus BiP. However, as ER stress rises again, the same enzyme, FICD, catalyses the opposite reaction, BiP de-AMPylation.

An understanding of the structural basis of BiP AMPylation and de-AMPylation is gradually emerging, as are clues to the allostery that might regulate the switch in FICD's activity but important details of this process as it occurs in cells remain to be discovered.

The role of FICD in BiP AMPylation (and de-AMPylation) on Thr518 is well supported by biochemical and structural studies. Evidence has also been presented that in some circumstances FICD may AMPylate a different residue, Thr366 in BiP's nucleotide binding domain.

=== Caenorhabditis elegans ===
Fic-1 is the only Fic protein present in the genetic code of C. elegans. It is primarily found in the ER nuclear envelope of adult germline cells and embryotic cells, but small amounts may be found within the cytoplasm. This extra-ER pool of FICD-1s is credited with AMPylation of core histones and eEF1-A type translation factors within the nematode.

Though varying AMPylation levels did not create any noticeable effects within the nematode's behaviour or physiology, Fic-1 knockout worms were more susceptible to infection by Pseudomonas aeruginosa compared to the counterparts with active Fic-1 domains, implying a link between AMPylation of cellular targets and immune responses within nematodes.

=== Drosophila melanogaster ===
Flies lacking in FICD (CG9523) have been described as blind. Initially, this defect was attributed to a role for FICD on the cell surface of capitate projections - a putative site of neurotransmitter recycling however a later study implicated FICD-mediated AMPylation of BiP Thr366 in the visual problem

== Clinical significance ==
The presynaptic protein α-synuclein was found to be a target for FICD AMPylation. During HypE-mediated adenylylation of αSyn, aggregation of αSyn decreases and both neurotoxicity and ER stress were discovered to decrease in vitro. Thus, adenylylation of αSyn is possibly a protective response to ER stress and αSyn aggregation. However, as aSyn and FICD reside in different compartments further research needs to be done confirm the significance of these claims.

== Detection ==
=== Chemical handles ===
Chemical handles are used to detect post-translationally modified proteins. Recently, there is a N6pATP that contains an alkynyl tag (propargyl) at the N6 position of the adenine of ATP. This N6pATP combines with the click reaction to detect AMPylated proteins. To detect unrecognized modified protein and label VopS substrates, ATP derivatives with a fluorophore at the adenine N6 NH2 is utilized to do that.

=== Antibody-based method ===
Antibodies are known for their high affinity and selectivity, making them a good way to detect AMPylated proteins. Recently, ɑ- AMP antibodies were developed to directly detect and isolate AMPylated proteins (especially AMPylated tyrosine and AMPylated threonine) from cells and cell lysates. AMPylation is a post-translational modification that can be found on many protein sequences. Thus, instead of using antibodies that detect a specific AMPylated peptide sequence, raising AMP antibodies directly targeted to specific amino acids are considered superior.

=== Mass spectrometry ===
Previously, many studies used Mass Spectrometry (MS) in different fragmentation modes to detect AMPylated peptides. In responses to the distinctive fragmentation techniques, AMPylated protein sequences disintegrated at different parts of AMP. While electron transfer dissociation (ETD) creates minimum fragments and less complicated spectra, collision-induced dissociation (CID) and high-energy collision (HCD) fragmentation generate characteristic ions suitable for AMPylated proteins identification by generating multiple AMP fragments. Due to AMP's stability, peptide fragmentation spectra is easy to read manually or with search engines.

== Inhibitors ==
Inhibitors of protein AMPylation with inhibitory constant (K_{i}) ranging from 6 - 50 μM and at least 30-fold selectivity versus HypE have been discovered.
