= FICD =

Identifiers
- Aliases: FICD, HIP13, HYPE, UNQ3041, FIC domain containing, FIC domain protein adenylyltransferase
- External IDs: MGI: 1098550; GeneCards: FICD
Available structures
PDB	Ortholog search: PDBe RCSB
PDB	List of PDB id codes 4U04, 4U07, 4U0S, 4U0U, 4U0Z
Enzyme activity
EC #	BRENDA	ExPASy	KEGG	MetaCyc
2.7.7.108	↗	↗	↗	↗

Gene location (Human)
Chr.	Chromosome 12 (human)
Band	12q23.3	Start	108,515,277 bp
Band	12q23.3	End	108,525,837 bp

Gene location (Mouse)
Chr.	Chromosome 5 (mouse)
Band	5 F|5 55.55 cM	Start	113,873,864 bp
Band	5 F|5 55.55 cM	End	113,878,661 bp
RNA expression pattern
Bgee	Human / Mouse (ortholog); Top expressed in: buccal mucosa cell; pancreatic ductal cell; islet of Langerhans; corpus epididymis; anterior pituitary; gonad; body of pancreas; optic nerve; testicle; stromal cell of endometrium / Top expressed in: lacrimal gland; islet of Langerhans; seminal vesicula; salivary gland; muscle of thigh; right kidney; pituitary gland; parotid gland; morula; morula; More reference expression data
BioGPS	n/a
Gene ontology
Molecular function	protein adenylyltransferase activity; nucleotidyltransferase activity; nucleotide binding; transferase activity; identical protein binding; ATP binding; Hsp70 protein binding; protein homodimerization activity; protein adenylylhydrolase activity; chaperone binding; hydrolase activity
Cellular component	membrane; integral component of membrane; integral component of endoplasmic reticulum membrane; endoplasmic reticulum; endoplasmic reticulum membrane
Biological process	protein adenylylation; negative regulation of GTPase activity; response to endoplasmic reticulum stress; protein deadenylylation; regulation of IRE1-mediated unfolded protein response; response to unfolded protein
Sources:Amigo / QuickGO
Orthologs
Databases	NCBI: entry; OMA: entry
Species	Human	Mouse
Entrez	11153	231630
Ensembl	ENSG00000198855	ENSMUSG00000053334
UniProt	Q9BVA6	Q8BIX9
RefSeq (mRNA)	NM_007076	NM_001010825
RefSeq (protein)	NP_009007	NP_001010825
Location (UCSC)	Chr 12: 108.52 – 108.53 Mb	Chr 5: 113.87 – 113.88 Mb
PubMed search
- Wikidata
View/Edit Human	View/Edit Mouse

FIC domain protein adenylyltransferase (FICD) is an enzyme in metazoans possessing adenylylation and deadenylylation activity (also known as (de)AMPylation), and is a member of the Fic (filamentation induced by cAMP) domain family of proteins. AMPylation is a reversible post-translational modification that FICD performs on target cellular protein substrates. FICD is the only known Fic domain encoded by the metazoan genome, and is located on chromosome 12 in humans. Catalytic activity is reliant on the enzyme's Fic domain, which catalyzes the addition of an AMP (adenylyl group) moiety to the substrate. FICD has been linked to many cellular pathways, most notably the ATF6 and PERK branches of the UPR (unfolded protein response) pathway regulating ER homeostasis. FICD is present at very low basal levels in most cell types in humans, and its expression is highly regulated. Examples of FICD include HYPE (Huntingtin Yeast Interacting Partner E) in humans, Fic-1 in C. elegans, and dfic in D. melanogaster.

== Structure ==
The structure of FICD proteins consists of different regions, which are the SS/TM (signal sequence/transmembrane domain),TPR (tetratricopeptide repeat) domain and fic (filamentation induced by cAMP) domain. The secondary structure is primarily composed of nine α-helices. All FICD proteins share the same catalytic motif in their fic domain, consisting of the amino acid sequence HxFx(D/E)(G/A)N(G/K)R_{1}xxR_{2}, located at the C terminus of the protein. At the N terminus of the protein is an inhibitory α-helix, composed of the motif (S/T)xxxE(G/N). Interaction between the glutamate of the inhibitory α-helix and the second arginine of the fic motif prevent ATP from entering the catalytic cleft of the protein and participating in AMPylation. This auto-inhibition leads to very low activity of FICD proteins in vitro.

Mutants of FICD have been created which lead to different activity levels in vitro. A mutation of the catalytic histidine in the fic motif to an alanine leads to a complete loss of AMPylation activity by the enzyme. Conversely, mutation of the glutamate in the inhibitory α-helix to a glycine abolishes any auto-inhibition, creating a constitutively active enzyme.

FICD proteins can exist as either a dimer or a monomer, although they generally exist as an asymmetric dimer in solution. Linkage occurs between the fic domains of the two monomers to form the dimer. New crystal structures have recently been published to model the structure the HYPE monomer.

== Mechanism ==
FICD's AMPylation activity is dependent on the sequence of its fic motif (HxFx(D/E)(G/A)N(G/K)R_{1}xxR_{2}). The basic mechanism of AMPylation involves the addition of an AMP group to a substrate residue containing a hydroxyl group, where the AMP group is taken from an ATP molecule. In the case of FICD proteins, the catalytic histidine acts as a general base, drawing a proton away from the hydroxyl group of the substrate (usually located on a threonine or serine residue). The hydroxyl group, now a nucleophile, will then attack the α-phosphate of ATP, thus attaching the AMP group to the target residue's hydroxyl group. This mechanism both requires the presence of the catalytic histidine and the correct orientation of ATP in the ATP-binding pocket of the FICD protein. Interactions between the secondary arginine (HxFx(D/E)GN(G/K)R_{1}xxR_{2}) and the γ-phosphate of ATP orients ATP correctly in the pocket so that the proton transfer between the hydroxyl group of the substrate and the α-phosphate of ATP can take place.

One mechanism by which FICD proteins are self-regulated is through interactions of the inhibitory α-helix and the catalytic fic domain. The glutamate found in the inhibitory α-helix motif ((S/T)xxxE(G/N))interacts with the secondary arginine in the fic motif, which in turn prevents interactions of the γ-phosphate of ATP at that site. Because ATP is unable to orient properly in the ATP binding pocket, AMPylation cannot occur.

FICD proteins are also capable of de-AMPylation activity, the complement to AMPylation. Research suggests that a switch between the dimerization state of FICD may be responsible for the switch between AMPylation and de-AMPylation activity, in which FICD in its monomeric form is responsible for AMPylation, while FICD as a dimer is responsible for de-AMPylation.

== Function ==
FIC proteins are known for their general function of carrying out post-translational modifications on target proteins that are a part of the cell signaling system. The conserved fic domain is involved in the addition of phosphate-containing compounds including AMP, GTP and other nucleoside monophosphates and phosphates. Fic proteins play a vital role in the mediation of post-translational modifications in host cell proteins that interfere with cytoskeletal, trafficking, signaling or translation pathways such as the UPR pathway. The UPR (unfolded protein response) pathway depends on the activation of transmembrane transducers during ER stress to promote specific downstream effects. In the event of fluctuating unfolded proteins the UPR pathway becomes activated, and this includes the activation of Hsp70 chaperone, Bip. This process incorporates inactive oligomers and reversible AMPylation and de-AMPylation activities. Bip/GRP78 is adenylated by HYPE, which induces the UPR activation, reportedly at the specific sites Thr366 and Thr518 in vitro, and thereby is able to assist in carrying out the modifications to target proteins in order to maintain ER homeostasis. The expression of HYPE is regulated depending on the magnitude of ER stress.

== Expression ==
Expression of FICD in most species and cell types occurs at very low levels, with human FICD (HYPE) being expressed between 2-20 NX of RNA in human cell lines. In humans, HYPE's under-expression has been linked to decreased ability of the UPR to maintain ER homeostasis.

In Drosophilia, knockdown of FICD (dfic in D. melanogaster) causes blindness in flies. This phenotype could be rescued by the expression of wild-type dfic in the glial cells of those flies.

In C. elegans, FICD (FIC-1 in C. elegans) is also expressed at a basal level throughout all cell types in the worm body. FIC-1 also shows no change in level of expression throughout the worm's lifetime. FIC-1 expression has been linked to immunity to P. aeruginosa, as mutants with inactive FIC-1 showed increased susceptibility to the bacteria.

== Localization ==
The region of localization depends on the type of organism that different FIC proteins reside in. In many cases FICD is situated in the lumen of the endoplasmic reticulum where it adenylates Hsp70 chaperone, binding immunoglobulin protein (BiP) at the Thr-366 and Thr-518. HYPE localizes in the ER via its hydrophobic N-terminus. Drosophila CG9523 or dFic can be found in the cytosolic region but are also transcriptionally activated during ER stress.

HYPE has two sites of N- glycosylation at Asn275 and Asn446. FICD is a type II transmembrane protein with the Fic domain facing the ER lumen. Similar results have been shown for dFic through in vitro translation in the presence of microsomes, which indicated N-glycosylation at site Asn288.

== Clinical significance ==
While FICD (HYPE in humans) has not been directly linked to any disease pathways, some of its substrates are known participants in human diseases. BiP (GRP78/HSPA5), a validated substrate of HYPE, has been substantially linked to increased rates of cancer cell survival under proapoptotic conditions. α-syn, a putative substrate for HYPE, is a known factor in the development of Parkinson's disease through the formation of protein aggregates in the brain. HYPE also has other potential roles in the fields of neurodevelopment and neurodegeneration.
