= Fic/DOC protein family =

Fic/DOC family
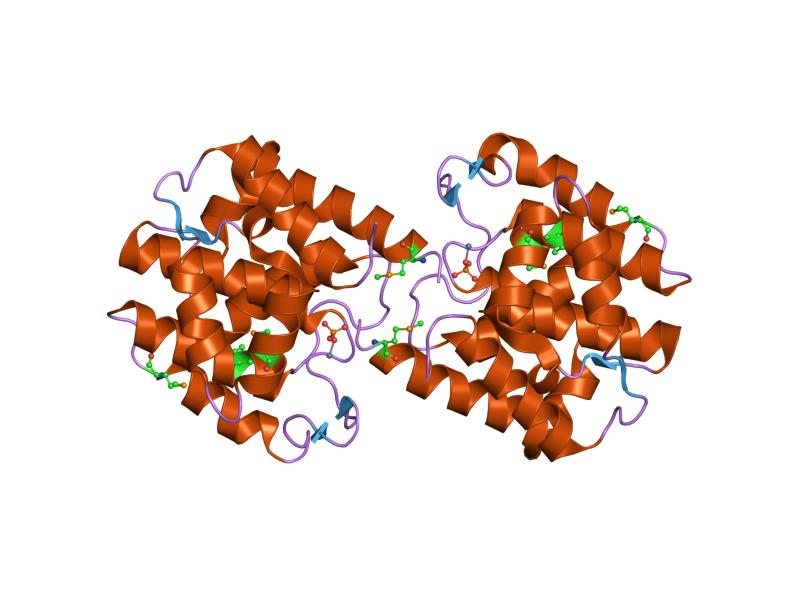
- structure of cell filamentation protein (fic) from helicobacter pylori

Identifiers
- Symbol: Fic
- Pfam: PF02661
- InterPro: IPR003812
Available protein structures:
- PDB: IPR003812 PF02661 (ECOD; PDBsum)
- AlphaFold: IPR003812; PF02661

In molecular biology, the Fic/DOC protein family is a family of proteins which catalyzes the post-translational modification of proteins using phosphate-containing compound as a substrate. Fic domain proteins typically use ATP as a co-factor, but in some cases GTP or UTP is used. Post-translational modification performed by Fic domains is usually NMPylation (AMPylation, GMPylation or UMPylation), however they also catalyze phosphorylation and phosphocholine transfer. This family contains a central conserved motif HPFX[D/E]GNGR in most members and it carries the invariant catalytic histidine. Fic domain was found in bacteria, eukaryotes and archaea and can be found organized in almost hundred different multi-domain assemblies.

== Functions ==
First fic gene was discovered in the late 1980s in Escherichia coli. Mutation in this gene impaired cell division under stress conditions (cyclic AMP in growth medium at high temperature), which led to annotation as fic-1 for filamentation induced by cAMP. The product of fic-1 was later characterized as toxin from toxin-antitoxin system. Fic domain protein from the Vibrio parahaemolyticus VopS is a toxin secreted by type III secretion system. It catalyses AMPylation of Rho GTPases in eukaryotic cells and therefore induces the collapse of the actin cytoskeleton. Doc (death on curing) protein is also part of a toxin-antitoxin module Phd-Doc from prophage P1. Doc toxin uses inverted substrate and catalyses phosphorylation instead of transferring NMP moiety. Doc phosphorylates elongation factor EF-Tu and locks it in an unfavorable open conformation to bind tRNAs and therefore blocks protein translation. Doc provides stability for P1 lysogens of Escherichia coli. Bacteria carry the prophage as a stable low copy number plasmid. The frequency with which viable cells cured of prophage are produced is about 10(-5) per cell per generation. A significant part of this remarkable stability can be attributed to a plasmid-encoded toxin-antitoxin module phd-doc causes death of cells that have lost P1. Overall bacterial Fic proteins are members of toxin-antitoxin systems and other proteins involved in stress responses and infections. The sole animal Fic-domain protein called HYPE or FICD is involved in proteostasis control by addition and removal of AMP from endoplasmic reticulum chaperone BIP.
