= Binding immunoglobulin protein =

Protein-coding gene in the species Homo sapiens

HSPA5

Identifiers
- Aliases: HSPA5, BIP, GRP78, HEL-S-89n, MIF2, Binding immunoglobulin protein, heat shock protein family A (Hsp70) member 5, GRP78/Bip
- External IDs: OMIM: 138120; MGI: 95835; GeneCards: HSPA5
Available structures
PDB	Ortholog search: PDBe RCSB
PDB	List of PDB id codes 3IUC, 3LDL, 3LDN, 3LDO, 3LDP, 5E84, 5E86, 5E85, 5F1X, 5EX5, 5EVZ, 5F2R, 5F0X, 5EY4, 5EXW
Enzyme activity
EC #	BRENDA	ExPASy	KEGG	MetaCyc
3.6.4.10	↗	↗	↗	↗

Gene location (Human)
Chr.	Chromosome 9 (human)
Band	9q33.3	Start	125,234,853 bp
Band	9q33.3	End	125,241,382 bp

Gene location (Mouse)
Chr.	Chromosome 2 (mouse)
Band	2 B|2 22.94 cM	Start	34,661,982 bp
Band	2 B|2 22.94 cM	End	34,667,559 bp
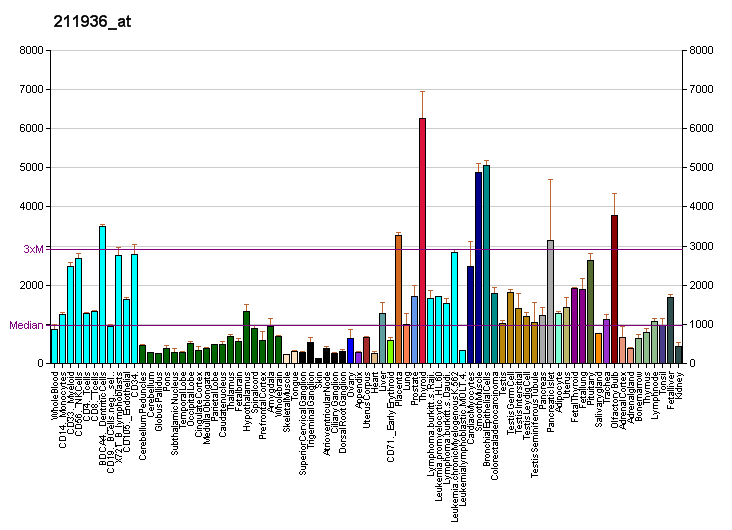
RNA expression pattern
Bgee	Human / Mouse (ortholog); Top expressed in: vena cava; beta cell; olfactory bulb; pericardium; corpus epididymis; mucosa of sigmoid colon; pylorus; lower lobe of lung; trachea; caput epididymis / Top expressed in: vestibular sensory epithelium; vestibular membrane of cochlear duct; mandibular prominence; maxillary prominence; primitive streak; endothelial cell of lymphatic vessel; seminal vesicula; vas deferens; superior cervical ganglion; lacrimal gland; More reference expression data
BioGPS	More reference expression data
Gene ontology
Molecular function	nucleotide binding; calcium ion binding; chaperone binding; protein domain specific binding; ribosome binding; misfolded protein binding; ATPase activity; protein binding; enzyme binding; ATP binding; ubiquitin protein ligase binding; unfolded protein binding; cadherin binding; hydrolase activity; heat shock protein binding; protein folding chaperone activity
Cellular component	cytoplasm; endoplasmic reticulum lumen; endoplasmic reticulum membrane; membrane; focal adhesion; melanosome; myelin sheath; plasma membrane; smooth endoplasmic reticulum; endoplasmic reticulum chaperone complex; cell surface; integral component of endoplasmic reticulum membrane; midbody; endoplasmic reticulum; mitochondrion; COP9 signalosome; extracellular exosome; nucleus; endoplasmic reticulum-Golgi intermediate compartment; extracellular matrix; cytosol; protein-containing complex; intracellular membrane-bounded organelle
Biological process	cellular response to interleukin-4; regulation of ATF6-mediated unfolded protein response; cellular response to glucose starvation; regulation of protein folding in endoplasmic reticulum; substantia nigra development; positive regulation of cell migration; positive regulation of transcription from RNA polymerase II promoter in response to endoplasmic reticulum stress; maintenance of protein localization in endoplasmic reticulum; negative regulation of apoptotic process; protein folding in endoplasmic reticulum; negative regulation of transforming growth factor beta receptor signaling pathway; toxin transport; response to endoplasmic reticulum stress; PERK-mediated unfolded protein response; cerebellum structural organization; ER overload response; endoplasmic reticulum unfolded protein response; ATF6-mediated unfolded protein response; IRE1-mediated unfolded protein response; cerebellar Purkinje cell layer development; regulation of PERK-mediated unfolded protein response; ubiquitin-dependent ERAD pathway; cellular response to antibiotic; negative regulation of protein homodimerization activity; proteolysis involved in cellular protein catabolic process; cellular response to manganese ion; positive regulation of protein ubiquitination; regulation of IRE1-mediated unfolded protein response; response to radiation; positive regulation of neuron projection development; neuron differentiation; response to cocaine; neuron apoptotic process; cellular response to calcium ion; cellular response to cAMP; stress response to metal ion; response to methamphetamine hydrochloride; cellular response to nerve growth factor stimulus; cellular response to gamma radiation; luteolysis; response to unfolded protein; cellular response to heat; Unfolded protein response; protein refolding; chaperone cofactor-dependent protein refolding; negative regulation of IRE1-mediated unfolded protein response; posttranslational protein targeting to membrane, translocation
Sources:Amigo / QuickGO
Orthologs
Databases	NCBI: entry; OMA: entry
Species	Human	Mouse
Entrez	3309	14828
Ensembl	ENSG00000044574	ENSMUSG00000026864
UniProt	P11021	P20029
RefSeq (mRNA)	NM_005347	NM_001163434; NM_022310
RefSeq (protein)	NP_005338	NP_001156906; NP_071705
Location (UCSC)	Chr 9: 125.23 – 125.24 Mb	Chr 2: 34.66 – 34.67 Mb
PubMed search
- Wikidata
View/Edit Human	View/Edit Mouse

Binding immunoglobulin protein (BiPS) also known as 78 kDa glucose-regulated protein (GRP-78) or heat shock 70 kDa protein 5 (HSPA5) or Byun1 is a protein that in humans is encoded by the HSPA5 gene.

BiP is a HSP70 molecular chaperone located in the lumen of the endoplasmic reticulum (ER) that binds newly synthesized proteins as they are translocated into the ER, and maintains them in a state competent for subsequent folding and oligomerization. BiP is also an essential component of the translocation machinery and plays a role in retrograde transport across the ER membrane of aberrant proteins destined for degradation by the proteasome. BiP is an abundant protein under all growth conditions, but its synthesis is markedly induced under conditions that lead to the accumulation of unfolded polypeptides in the ER.

== Structure ==
BiP contains two functional domains: a nucleotide-binding domain (NBD) and a substrate-binding domain (SBD). The NBD binds and hydrolyzes ATP, and the SBD binds polypeptides.

The NBD consists of two large globular subdomains (I and II), each further divided into two small subdomains (A and B). The subdomains are separated by a cleft where the nucleotide, one Mg^{2+}, and two K^{+} ions bind and connect all four domains (IA, IB, IIA, IIB). The SBD is divided into two subdomains: SBDβ and SBDα. SBDβ serves as a binding pocket for client proteins or peptide and SBDα serves as a helical lid to cover the binding pocket. An inter-domain linker connects NBD and SBD, favoring the formation of an NBD–SBD interface.

== Mechanism ==
The activity of BiP is regulated by its allosteric ATPase cycle: when ATP is bound to the NBD, the SBDα lid is open, which leads to the conformation of SBD with low affinity to substrate. Upon ATP hydrolysis, ADP is bound to the NBD and the lid closes on the bound substrate. This creates a low off rate for high-affinity substrate binding and protects the bound substrate from premature folding or aggregation. Exchange of ADP for ATP results in the opening of the SBDα lid and subsequent release of the substrate, which then is free to fold. The ATPase cycle can be synergistically enhanced by protein disulfide isomerase (PDI), and its cochaperones.

== Function ==
When K12 cells are starved of glucose, the synthesis of several proteins, called glucose-regulated proteins (GRPs), is markedly increased. Utilizing this experimental system, the mammalian GRPs were being cloned and identified in 1981 in the laboratory of Dr. Amy Shiu Lee. GRP78 (HSPA5), also referred to as 'immunoglobulin heavy chain-binding protein' (BiP), is a member of the heat-shock protein-70 (HSP70) family and involved in the folding and assembly of proteins in the ER. The level of BiP is strongly correlated with the amount of secretory proteins (e.g. IgG) within the ER.

Substrate release and binding by BiP facilitates diverse functions in the ER such as folding and assembly of newly synthesized proteins, binding to misfolded proteins to prevent protein aggregation, translocation of secretory proteins, and initiation of the UPR.

=== Protein folding and holding ===
BiP can actively fold its substrates (acting as a foldase) or simply bind and restrict a substrate from folding or aggregating (acting as a holdase). Intact ATPase activity and peptide binding activity are required to act as a foldase: temperature-sensitive mutants of BiP with defective ATPase activity (called class I mutations) and mutants of BiP with defective peptide binding activity (called class II mutations) both fail to fold carboxypeptidase Y (CPY) at non-permissive temperature.

=== ER translocation ===
As an ER molecular chaperone, BiP is also required to import polypeptide into the ER lumen or ER membrane in an ATP-dependent manner. ATPase mutants of BiP were found to cause a block in translocation of a number of proteins (invertase, carboxypeptidase Y, a-factor) into the lumen of the ER.

=== Er-associated degradation (ERAD) ===
BiP also plays a role in ERAD. The most studied ERAD substrate is CPY*, a constitutively misfolded CPY completely imported into the ER and modified by glycosylation. BiP is the first chaperone that contacts CPY* and is required for CPY* degradation. ATPase mutants (including allosteric mutants) of BiP have been shown to significantly slow down the degradation rate of CPY*.

=== UPR pathway ===
BiP is both a target of the ER stress response, or UPR, and an essential regulator of the UPR pathway. During ER stress, BiP dissociates from the three transducers (IRE1, PERK, and ATF6), effectively activating their respective UPR pathways. As a UPR target gene product, BiP is upregulated when UPR transcription factors associate with the UPR element in BiP's DNA promoter region.

== Interactions ==
BiP's ATPase cycle is facilitated by its co-chaperones, both nucleotide binding factors (NEFs), which facilitate ATP binding upon ADP release, and J proteins, which promote ATP hydrolysis. BiP is also a validated substrate of HYPE (Huntingtin Yeast Interacting Partner E), which can adenylate BiP at multiple residues.

== Conservation of BiP cysteines ==
BiP is highly conserved among eukaryotes, including mammals (Table 1). It is also widely expressed among all tissue types in human. In the human BiP, there are two highly conserved cysteines. These cysteines have been shown to undergo post-translational modifications in both yeast and mammalian cells. In yeast cells, the N-terminus cysteine has been shown to be sulfenylated and glutathionylated upon oxidative stress. Both modifications enhance BiP's ability to prevent protein aggregation. In mice cells, the conserved cysteine pair forms a disulfide bond upon activation of GPx7 (NPGPx). The disulfide bond enhances BiP's binding to denatured proteins.

Table 1. Conservation of BiP in mammalian cells
	Species common name	Species scientific name	Conservation of BiP	Conservation of BiP's cysteine	Cysteine number
Primates	Human	Homo sapiens	Yes	Yes	2
Primates	Macaque	Macaca fuscata	Yes	Yes	2
Primates	Vervet	Chlorocebus sabaeus	Predicted*	Yes	2
Primates	Marmoset	Callithrix jacchus	Yes	Yes	2
Rodents	Mouse	Mus musculus	Yes	Yes	2
Rodents	Rat	Rattus norvegicus	Yes	Yes	3
Rodents	Guinea pig	Cavia porcellus	Predicted	Yes	3
Rodents	Naked mole rat	Heterocephalus glaber	Yes	Yes	3
Rodents	Rabbit	Oryctolagus cuniculus	Predicted	Yes	2
Rodents	Tree shrew	Tupaia chinensis	Yes	Yes	2
Ungulates	Cow	Bos taurus	Yes	Yes	2
Ungulates	Minke whale	Balaenoptera acutorostrata scammoni	Yes	Yes	2
Ungulates	Pig	Sus scrofa	Predicted	Yes	2
Carnivores	Dog	Canis familiaris	Predicted	Yes	2
Carnivores	Cat	Felis silvestris	Yes	Yes	3
Carnivores	Ferret	Mustela putorius furo	Predicted	Yes	2
Marsupials	Opossum	Monodelphis domestica	Predicted	Yes	2
Marsupials	Tasmanian Devil	Sarcophilus harrisii	Predicted	Yes	2
*Predicted: Predicted sequence according to NCBI protein

== Clinical significance ==
=== Autoimmune disease ===
Like many stress and heat shock proteins, BiP has potent immunological activity when released from the internal environment of the cell into the extracellular space. Specifically, it feeds anti-inflammatory and pro-resolutory signals into immune networks, thus helping to resolve inflammation. The mechanisms underlying BiP's immunological activity are incompletely understood. Nonetheless, it has been shown to induce anti-inflammatory cytokine secretion by binding to a receptor on the surface of monocytes, downregulate critical molecules involved in T-lymphocyte activation, and modulate the differentiation pathway of monocytes into dendritic cells.

The potent immunomodulatory activities of BiP/GRP78 have also been demonstrated in animal models of autoimmune disease including collagen-induced arthritis, a murine disease that resembles human rheumatoid arthritis. Prophylactic or therapeutic parenteral delivery of BiP has been shown to ameliorate clinical and histological signs of inflammatory arthritis.

=== Cardiovascular disease ===
Upregulation of BiP has been associated with ER stress-induced cardiac dysfunction and dilated cardiomyopathy. BiP also has been proposed to suppress the development of atherosclerosis through alleviating homocysteine-induced ER stress, preventing apoptosis of vascular endothelial cells, inhibiting the activation of genes responsible for cholesterol/triglyceride biosynthesis, and suppressing tissue factor procoagulant activity, all of which can contribute to the buildup of atherosclerotic plaques.

Some anticancer drugs, such as proteasome inhibitors, have been associated with heart failure complications. In rat neonatal cardiomyocytes, overexpression of BiP attenuates cardiomyocyte death induced by proteasome inhibition.

=== Neurodegenerative disease ===
As an ER chaperone protein, BiP prevents neuronal cell death induced by ER stress by correcting misfolded proteins. Moreover, a chemical inducer of BiP, named BIX, reduced cerebral infarction in cerebral ischemic mice. Conversely, enhanced BiP chaperone function has been strongly implicated in Alzheimer's disease.

=== Metabolic disease ===
BiP heterozygosity is proposed to protect against high fat diet-induced obesity, type 2 diabetes, and pancreatitis by upregulating protective ER stress pathways. BiP is also necessary for adipogenesis and glucose homeostasis in adipose tissues.

=== Infectious disease ===
Prokaryotic BiP orthologs were found to interact with key proteins such as RecA, which is vital to bacterial DNA replication. As a result, these bacterial Hsp70 chaperones represent a promising set of targets for antibiotic development. Notably, the anticancer drug OSU-03012 re-sensitized superbug strains of Neisseria gonorrhoeae to several standard-of-care antibiotics. Meanwhile, a virulent strain of Shiga toxigenic Escherichia coli undermines host cell survival by producing AB5 toxin to inhibit host BiP. In contrast, Dr. Amy Shiu Lee and others pioneered the discovery that viruses rely on host BiP to successfully replicate, largely by infecting cells through cell-surface BiP, stimulating BiP expression to chaperone viral proteins, and suppressing the ER stress death response.
