= Proteostasis =

Process of regulating a functional proteome

Proteostasis is the dynamic regulation of a balanced, functional proteome. The proteostasis network includes competing and integrated biological pathways within cells that control the biogenesis, folding, trafficking, and degradation of proteins present within and outside the cell. Loss of proteostasis is central to understanding the cause of diseases associated with excessive protein misfolding and degradation leading to loss-of-function phenotypes, as well as aggregation-associated degenerative disorders. Therapeutic restoration of proteostasis may treat or resolve these pathologies.

Cellular proteostasis is key to ensuring successful development, healthy aging, resistance to environmental stresses, and to minimize homeostatic perturbations from pathogens such as viruses. Cellular mechanisms for maintaining proteostasis include regulated protein translation, chaperone assisted protein folding, and protein degradation pathways. Adjusting each of these mechanisms based on the need for specific proteins is essential to maintain all cellular functions relying on a correctly folded proteome.

== Mechanisms of proteostasis ==
=== The roles of the ribosome in proteostasis ===
One of the first points of regulation for proteostasis is during translation. This regulation is accomplished via the structure of the ribosome, a complex central to translation. Its characteristics shape the way the protein folds, and influence the protein's future interactions. The synthesis of a new peptide chain using the ribosome is very slow; the ribosome can even be stalled when it encounters a rare codon, a codon found at low concentrations in the cell. The slow synthesis rate and any such pauses provide an individual protein domain with the necessary time to become folded before the production of subsequent domains. This facilitates the correct folding of multi-domain proteins.

The newly synthesized peptide chain exits the ribosome into the cellular environment through the narrow ribosome exit channel (width: 10Å to 20Å, length 80Å). Characteristics of the exit channel control the formation of secondary and limited tertiary structures in the nascent chain. For example, an alpha helix is a structural property that is commonly induced in this exit channel. At the same time, the exit channel prevents premature folding by impeding large scale interactions within the peptide chain that would require more space.

=== Molecular chaperones and post-translational maintenance in proteostasis ===
In order to maintain protein homeostasis post-translationally, the cell makes use of molecular chaperones sometimes including chaperonins, which aid in the assembly or disassembly of proteins. They recognize exposed segments of hydrophobic amino acids in the nascent peptide chain and then work to promote the proper formation of noncovalent interactions that lead to the desired folded state. Chaperones begin to assist in protein folding as soon as a nascent chain longer than 60 amino acids emerges from the ribosome exit channel.

One of the most studied ribosome binding chaperones is trigger factor (TF). TF works to stabilize the peptide, promotes its folding, prevents aggregation, and promotes refolding of denatured model substrates. Ribosome profiling experiments have shown that TF predominantly targets ribosomes translating outer membrane proteins in vivo, and moreover are underrepresented on ribosomes translating inner membrane proteins. TF not only directly works to properly fold the protein but also recruits other chaperones to the ribosome, such as Hsp70. Hsp70 surrounds an unfolded peptide chain, thereby preventing aggregation and promoting folding.

Chaperonins are a special class of chaperones that promote native state folding by cyclically encapsulating the peptide chain. Chaperonins are divided into two groups. Group 1 chaperonins are commonly found in bacteria, chloroplasts, and mitochondria. Group 2 chaperonins are found in the cytosol of eukaryotic cells as well as in archaea. Group 2 chaperonins also contain an additional helical component which acts as a lid for the cylindrical protein chamber, unlike Group 1 which instead relies on an extra cochaperone to act as a lid. All chaperonins exhibit two states (open and closed), between which they can cycle. This cycling process is important during the folding of an individual polypeptide chain as it helps to avoid undesired interactions as well as to prevent the peptide from entering into kinetically trapped states.

=== Regulating proteostasis by protein degradation ===
The third component of the proteostasis network is the protein degradation machinery. Protein degradation occurs in proteostasis when the cellular signals indicate the need to decrease overall cellular protein levels. The effects of protein degradation can be local, with the cell only experiencing effects from the loss of the degraded protein itself or widespread, with the entire protein landscape changing due to loss of other proteins' interactions with the degraded protein.

Multiple substrates are targets for proteostatic degradation. These degradable substrates include nonfunctional protein fragments produced from ribosomal stalling during translation, misfolded or unfolded proteins, aggregated proteins, and proteins that are no longer needed to carry out cellular function.

Several different pathways exist for carrying out these degradation processes. When proteins are determined to be unfolded or misfolded, they are typically degraded via the unfolded protein response (UPR) or endoplasmic-reticulum-associated protein degradation (ERAD). Substrates that are unfolded, misfolded, or no longer required for cellular function can also be ubiquitin tagged for degradation by ATP dependent proteases, such as the proteasome in eukaryotes or ClpXP in prokaryotes. Autophagy, or self engulfment, lysosomal targeting, and phagocytosis (engulfment of waste products by other cells) can also be used as proteostatic degradation mechanisms.

== Signaling events in proteostasis ==
Protein misfolding is detected by mechanisms that are specific for the cellular compartment in which they occur. Distinct surveillance mechanisms that respond to unfolded protein have been characterized in the cytoplasm, endoplasmatic reticulum (ER) and mitochondria. This response acts locally in a cell autonomous fashion but can also extend to intercellular signaling to protect the organism from anticipated proteotoxic stress.

=== Cell-autonomous stress responses ===
Cellular stress response pathways detect and alleviate proteotoxic stress which is triggered by imbalances in proteostasis. The cell-autonomous regulation occurs through direct detection of misfolded proteins or inhibition of pathway activation by sequestering activating components in response to heat shock. Cellular responses to this stress signaling include transcriptional activation of chaperone expression, increased efficiency in protein trafficking and protein degradation and translational reduction.

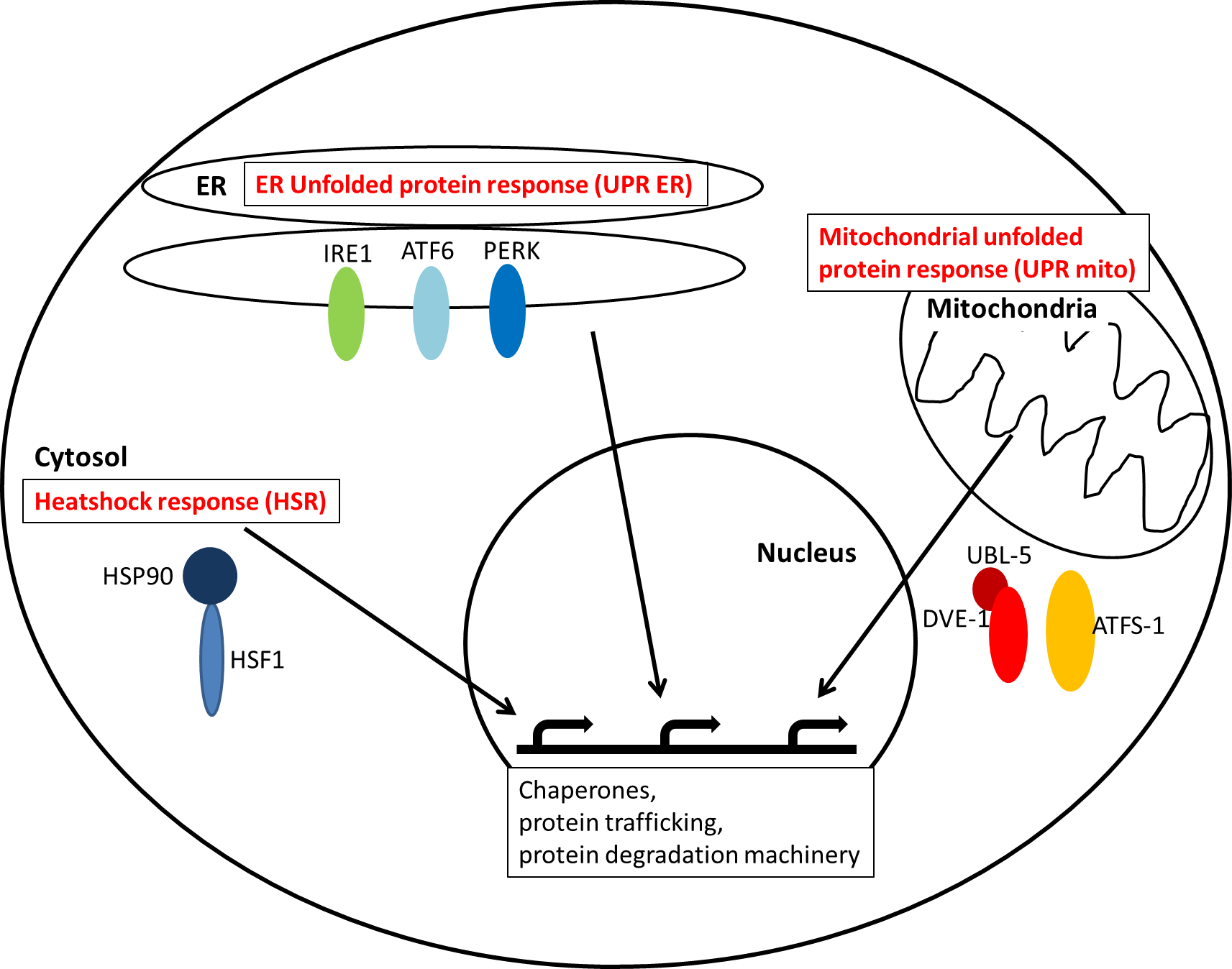
Proteostasis stress signaling response

=== Cytosolic heat shock response ===
The cytosolic heat shock response (HSR) is mainly mediated by the transcription factor family HSF (heat shock family). HSF is constitutively bound by Hsp90. Upon a proteotoxic stimulus Hsp90 is recruited away from HSF, which can then bind to heat response elements in the DNA and upregulate gene expression of proteins involved in the maintenance of proteostasis.

=== ER unfolded protein response ===
The unfolded protein response (UPR) in the ER is activated by imbalances of unfolded proteins inside the ER and the proteins mediating protein homeostasis. Different "detectors" - such as IRE1, ATF6 and PERK - can recognize misfolded proteins in the ER and mediate transcriptional responses which help alleviate the effects of ER stress.

=== Mitochondrial unfolded protein response ===
The mitochondrial unfolded protein response detects imbalances in protein stoichiometry of mitochondrial proteins and misfolded proteins. The expression of mitochondrial chaperones is upregulated by the activation of the transcription factors ATF1 and/or DVE-1 with UBL5.

=== Systemic stress signaling ===
Stress responses can also be triggered in a non-cell autonomous fashion by intercellular communication. The stress that is sensed in one tissue could thereby be communicated to other tissues to protect the proteome of the organism or to regulate proteostasis systemically. Cell non-autonomous activation can occur for all three stress responses.

Work on the model organism C. elegans has shown that neurons play a role in this intercellular communication of cytosolic HSR. Stress induced in the neurons of the worm can in the long run protect other tissues such as muscle and intestinal cells from chronic proteotoxicity. Similarly ER and mitochondrial UPR in neurons are relayed to intestinal cells . These systemic responses have been implicated in mediating systemic proteostasis; they also influence organismal aging.

== Diseases of proteostasis ==
=== Proteostasis and diseases of protein folding ===
Dysfunction in proteostasis can arise from errors in or misregulation of protein folding. The classic examples are missense mutations and deletions that change the thermodynamic and kinetic parameters for the protein folding process. These mutations are often inherited and range in phenotypic severity from having no noticeable effect to embryonic lethality. Disease develops when these mutations render a protein significantly more susceptible to misfolding, aggregation, and degradation.

If these effects only alter the mutated protein, the negative consequences will only be local loss of function. However, if these mutations occur in a chaperone or a protein that interacts with many other proteins, dramatic global alterations in the proteostasis boundary will occur. Examples of diseases resulting from proteostatic changes from errors in protein folding include cystic fibrosis, Huntington's disease, Alzheimer's disease, lysosomal storage disorders, and others.

=== The role of model systems in the elucidation of protein-misfolding diseases ===
Small animal model systems have been and continue to be instrumental in the identification of functional mechanisms that safeguard proteostasis. Model systems of diverse misfolding-prone disease proteins have so far revealed numerous chaperone and co-chaperone modifiers of proteotoxicity.

=== Proteostasis and cancer ===
The unregulated cell division that marks cancer development requires increased protein synthesis for cancer cell function and survival. This increased protein synthesis is typically seen in proteins that modulate cell metabolism and growth processes. Cancer cells are sometimes susceptible to drugs that inhibit chaperones and disrupt proteostasis, such as Hsp90 inhibitors or proteasome inhibitors.

Furthermore, cancer cells tend to produce misfolded proteins, which are removed mainly by proteolysis. Inhibitors of proteolysis allow accumulation of both misfolded protein aggregates, as well as apoptosis signaling proteins in cancer cells. This can change the sensitivity of cancer cells to antineoplastic drugs; cancer cells either die at a lower drug concentration, or survive, depending on the type of proteins that accumulate, and the function these proteins have. Proteasome inhibitor bortezomib was the first drug of this type to receive approval for treatment of multiple myeloma.

=== Proteostasis and obesity ===
A hallmark of cellular proteostatic networks is their ability to adapt to stress via protein regulation. Metabolic disease, such as that associated with obesity, alters the ability of cellular proteostasis networks to adapt to stress, often with detrimental health effects. For example, when insulin production exceeds the cell's insulin secretion capacity, proteostatic collapse occurs and chaperone production is severely impaired. This disruption leads to the disease symptoms exhibited in individuals with diabetes.

=== Proteostasis and aging ===
Over time, the proteostasis network becomes burdened with proteins modified by reactive oxygen species and metabolites that induce oxidative damage. These byproducts can react with cellular proteins to cause misfolding and aggregation (especially in nondividing cells like neurons). This risk is particularly high for intrinsically disordered proteins. The insulin-like growth factor 1 receptor (IGF-1R) pathway has been shown in C. elegans to protect against these harmful aggregates, and some experimental work has suggested that upregulation of IGF-1R may stabilize proteostatic network and prevent detrimental effects of aging.

Expression of the chaperome, the ensemble of chaperones and co-chaperones that interact in a complex network of molecular folding machines to regulate proteome function, is dramatically repressed in human aging brains and in the brains of patients with neurodegenerative diseases. Functional assays in C. elegans and human cells have identified a conserved chaperome sub-network of 16 chaperone genes, corresponding to 28 human orthologs as a proteostasis safeguard in aging and age-onset neurodegenerative disease.

=== Pharmacologic intervention in proteostasis ===
There are two main approaches that have been used for therapeutic development targeting the proteostatic network: pharmacologic chaperones and proteostasis regulators. The principle behind designing pharmacologic chaperones for intervention in diseases of proteostasis is to design small molecules that stabilize proteins exhibiting borderline stability.

Previously, this approach has been used to target and stabilize G-protein coupled receptors, neurotransmitter receptors, glycosidases, lysosomal storage proteins, and the mutant CFTR protein that causes cystic fibrosis and transthyretin, which can misfiled and aggregate leading to amyloidoses. Vertex Pharmaceuticals and Pfizer sell regulatory agency approved pharmacologic chaperones for ameliorating cystic fibrosis and the transthyretin amyloidoses, respectively. Amicus sells a regulatory agency approved pharmacologic chaperone for Fabry disease–a lysosomal storage disease.

The principle behind proteostasis regulators is different. These molecules alter the biology of protein folding and/or degradation by altering the stoichiometry of the proteostasis network components in a given sub cellular compartment. For example, some proteostasis regulators initiate stress responsive signaling, such as the unfolded protein response, which transcriptionally reprograms the endoplasmic reticulum proteostasis network.

It has been suggested that this approach could even be applied prophylactically, such as upregulating certain protective pathways before experiencing an anticipated severe cellular stress. One theoretical mechanism for this approach includes upregulating the heat shock response to rescue proteins from degradation during cellular stress.

== See also ==
- Molecular chaperone therapy
