= Glucose-regulated protein =

Glucose-regulated protein is a protein in the endoplasmic reticulum in the cell.

It comes in several different molecular masses, including:

- Grp78 (78 kDa)
- Grp94 (94 kDa)
- Grp170 (170 kDa), which is a human chaperone protein
