= Amy Shiu Lee =

American biochemist

Amy S. Lee
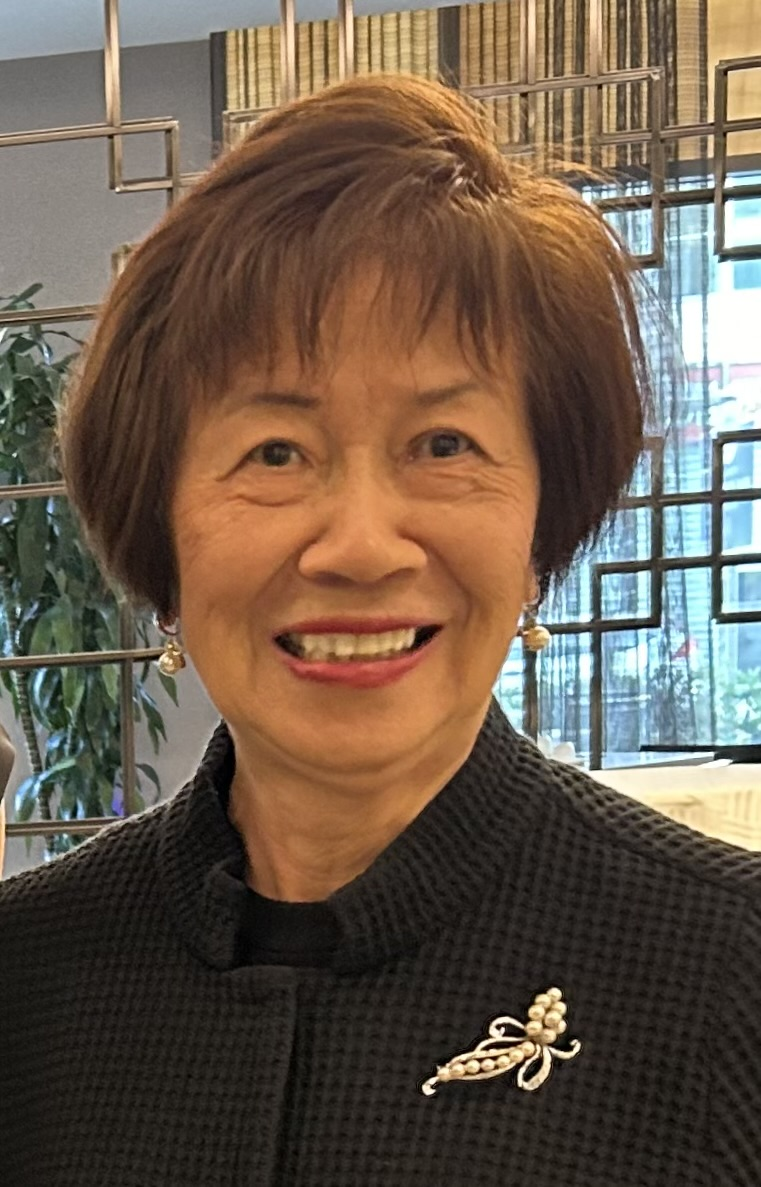
- Amy Shiu Lee, 2024
- Born: Guangdong, China
- Education: University of California, Berkeley; California Institute of Technology
- Known for: Research on endoplasmic reticulum stress and GRP78/BiP
- Awards: American Cancer Society Faculty Research Award (1983); National Cancer Institute MERIT Award (1988); Fellow of the American Association for the Advancement of Science (2006); USC Associates Award for Creativity in Research and Scholarship (2018); USC Faculty Lifetime Achievement Award (2026)
- Scientific career
- Fields: Biochemistry; Cancer biology
- Workplaces: University of Southern California

Amy S. Lee is a Chinese-born American biochemist and cancer biologist. She has served as Professor of Biochemistry and Molecular Medicine at the Keck School of Medicine of the University of Southern California (USC) from 1979 to 2025. Lee is best known for her pioneering research on endoplasmic reticulum (ER) stress and the discovery, regulation, and functions of the ER chaperone glucose-regulated protein 78 (GRP78), also known as BiP. Her work has been highly influential in elucidating the role of ER stress responses in development, cancer progression, therapeutic resistance, and viral infection. She served as Associate Director for Basic Research at the USC Norris Comprehensive Cancer Center from 1996 to 2019 and held the Judy and Larry Freeman Chair in Basic Science in Cancer Research. She has been Professor Emerita at USC since 2026.

== Early life and education ==
Lee was born in Guangdong province in China, and grew up in Hong Kong. After high school in Hong Kong, she earned a Bachelor of Arts degree in Bacteriology and Immunology from the University of California, Berkeley, graduating as valedictorian in 1970. She subsequently attended the California Institute of Technology, where she received a Doctor of Philosophy degree in 1975.

== Academic career ==
Following postdoctoral training and service as a senior research associate at the California Institute of Technology, Lee joined the Department of Biochemistry at the Keck School of Medicine of USC in 1979 as an assistant professor. There, she established a research program focused on mammalian stress responses and molecular chaperones. Over the course of her career, she held multiple leadership roles at the USC Norris Comprehensive Cancer Center, including Director of the Gene Regulation Program (1987–1997), Associate Director for Basic Research (1996–2019), and Associate Director for Shared Resources (2020–2021).

Lee has also been recognized for her sustained commitment to mentoring graduate students, postdoctoral fellows, and junior faculty at USC.

== Research contributions ==
=== ER stress and glucose-regulated proteins ===
Lee’s laboratory is the first to clone and characterize the mammalian genes encoding endoplasmic reticulum stress–inducible glucose-regulated proteins (GRPs). Her work helped define the transcriptional and post-transcriptional mechanisms governing GRP expression and established ER stress responses as central regulators of cellular homeostasis during development and disease.

=== GRP78 in cancer biology ===
A major focus of Lee’s research has been the ER chaperone GRP78, which she isolated in 1980. Her laboratory demonstrated that GRP78 plays a critical role in tumorigenesis, metastatic progression, and resistance to cancer therapies. She also reported that under conditions of cellular stress, GRP78 can relocalize from the ER to other cellular compartments, including the cell surface, where it functions as a co-receptor in oncogenic signaling pathways. Additionally, her group provided evidence that stress conditions can promote nuclear localization of GRP78, where it influences gene regulatory programs associated with cell migration and invasion. These findings challenged prevailing models of protein compartmentalization and expanded understanding of noncanonical chaperone functions in cancer.

=== GRP78 and viral infection ===
During the COVID-19 pandemic, Lee’s laboratory investigated the role of GRP78 in viral infection. Her group reported that cell surface–localized GRP78 functions as a host co-receptor for SARS-CoV-2 entry and that ER-localized GRP78 is required for efficient viral protein folding and production. This work suggests that targeting GRP78 could have therapeutic potential against both cancer and viral pathogens that exploit ER stress pathways.

== Selected publications ==
- Lee, Amy S. (2014). "Glucose-regulated proteins in cancer: molecular mechanisms and therapeutic potential". Nature Reviews Cancer. 14 (4): 263–276. doi:10.1038/nrc3701. ISSN 1474-1768. PMC 4158750. PMID 24658275.
- Tsai, Yuan-Li; Ha, Dat P.; Zhao, He; Carlos, Anthony J.; Wei, Shan; Pun, Tsam Kiu; Wu, Kaijin; Zandi, Ebrahim; Kelly, Kevin; Lee, Amy S. (2018). "Endoplasmic reticulum stress activates SRC, relocating chaperones to the cell surface where GRP78/CD109 blocks TGF-β signaling". Proceedings of the National Academy of Sciences. 115 (18): E4245–E4254. Bibcode:2018PNAS..115E4245T. doi:10.1073/pnas.1714866115. PMC 5939063. PMID 29654145.
- Carlos, Anthony J.; Ha, Dat P.; Yeh, Da-Wei; Krieken, Richard Van; Tseng, Chun-Chih; Zhang, Pu; Gill, Parkash; Machida, Keigo; Lee, Amy S. (2021). "The chaperone GRP78 is a host auxiliary factor for SARS-CoV-2 and GRP78 depleting antibody blocks viral entry and infection". Journal of Biological Chemistry. 296 100759. doi:10.1016/j.jbc.2021.100759. ISSN 0021-9258. PMC 8102082. PMID 33965375.
- Liu, Ze; Liu, Guanlin; Ha, Dat P.; Wang, Justin; Xiong, Min; Lee, Amy S. (2023). "ER chaperone GRP78/BiP translocates to the nucleus under stress and acts as a transcriptional regulator". Proceedings of the National Academy of Sciences. 120 (31) e2303448120. Bibcode:2023PNAS..12003448L. doi:10.1073/pnas.2303448120. PMC 10400976. PMID 37487081.

== Honors and awards ==
- Valedictorian, University of California, Berkeley, Department of Bacteriology and Immunology (1970)
- American Cancer Society Faculty Research Award (1983)
- National Cancer Institute MERIT Award (1988)
- Judy and Larry Freeman Chair in Basic Science in Cancer Research (1997)
- Fellow, American Association for the Advancement of Science (2006)
- USC Mellon Mentoring Award (2012)
- USC Associates Award for Creativity in Research and Scholarship (2018)
- Mark Brothers Award, Indiana University School of Medicine (2019)
- Spirit of Budapest Pioneer Award, Cell Stress Society International (2019)
- USC Faculty Lifetime Achievement Award (2026)
