= Holdase =

Class of enzymes

In molecular biology, holdases are a particular kind of molecular chaperones that assist the non-covalent folding of proteins in an ATP-independent manner. Examples of holdases are DnaJ and Hsp33.

Holdases bind to protein folding intermediates to prevent their aggregation but without directly refolding them. They stand in opposition to foldases, which are chaperones that use ATP to fold proteins.

== See also ==
- Foldase
- Chaperonin
- Co-chaperone
