= Chaperome =

Chaperome refers to the ensemble of all cellular molecular chaperone and co-chaperone proteins that assist protein folding of misfolded proteins or folding intermediates in order to ensure native protein folding and function, to antagonize aggregation-related proteotoxicity and ensuing protein loss-of-function or protein misfolding-diseases such as the neurodegenerative diseases Alzheimer's, Huntington's or Parkinson's disease, as well as to safeguard cellular proteostasis and proteome balance.

The term chaperome was first coined in a 2006 publication in Cell by Balch and co-workers on the finding that down-regulation of the Hsp90 co-chaperone Aha1 rescues misfolding of CFTR in cystic fibrosis to describe the overall chaperone folding environment, or the "chaperome". In 2014, Brehme and co-workers systematically studied the expression dynamics of the full human chaperome comprising ~300 human chaperones and co-chaperones in human aging brains and in brains of patients with neurodegenerative diseases. Integration with chaperome-wide functional RNA interference (RNAi) perturbation experiments in worm and in human cells led to the identification of a chaperome sub-network that safeguards proteostasis in aging and neurodegenerative diseases.

Recently, a comprehensive literature survey reviewed the literature since the release of the human genome sequence in 2000 for systematic studies in small animal model systems and highlighted the power of model systems to unveil those key chaperone modifiers of proteotoxicity out of the large number represented in the wider human chaperome that could inform targets and strategies for therapeutic regulation of chaperone functionality.

In 2016, a Nature article authored by Rodina et al. introduced a novel term, epichaperome, to refer to a network of existent chaperomes that are found only in cancer cells. More specifically, a few of the major players of this network include heat-shock protein 90 (Hsp90) and heat-shock cognate protein 70 (Hsc70). As opposed to in normal, healthy cells, where these chaperomes are abundant and functional on their own, in cancer cells, changes in the interactions between chaperomes lead to the formation of a network of chaperomes, co-chaperomes, and related co-factors. What has been found is that this strengthened network amongst chaperomes is a mechanism for survival for cancer cells when adapting to stress including hypoxia and heat. The small molecule Hsp90 inhibitor, PU-H71, has been found to have a preferential binding to Hsp90 when it is in the highly integrated complexed form that is the epichaperome.

== See also ==
- Molecular chaperone therapy
