= Foldase =

Class of enzymes

In molecular biology, foldases are a particular kind of molecular chaperones that assist the non-covalent folding of proteins in an ATP-dependent manner. Examples of foldase systems are the GroEL/GroES and the DnaK/DnaJ/GrpE system.

== See also ==
- Holdase
- Chaperonin
- Co-chaperone
