= Alpha factor =

Factors found in materials science

The α-factor is a dimensionless quantity used to predict the solid–liquid interface type of a material during solidification. It was introduced by physicist Kenneth A. Jackson in 1958. In his model, crystal growth with larger values of α is smooth, whereas crystals growing at smaller α (below the threshold value of 2) have rough surfaces.

== Method ==
According to John E. Gruzleski in his book Microstructure Development During Metalcasting (1996):

$$\alpha = \frac{L}{kT_\mathrm{E}}\cdot\frac{\eta}{v}$$

where $L$ is the latent heat of fusion; $k$ is the Boltzmann constant; $T_\mathrm{E}$ is the freezing temperature at equilibrium; $\eta$ is the number of nearest neighbours an atom has in the interface plane; and $v$ is the number of nearest neighbours in the bulk solid.

As $\frac{L}{T_\mathrm{E}} = \Delta S_f$, where $\Delta S_f$ is the molar entropy of fusion of the material,

$\alpha = \frac{\Delta S_f}{k} \cdot \frac{\eta}{v}$

According to Martin Glicksman in his book Principles of Solidification: An Introduction to Modern Casting and Crystal Growth Concepts (2011):

$$\alpha = \frac{\Delta S_f}{R_\mathrm{g}} \cdot\frac{\eta_1}{Z}$$

where $R_\mathrm{g}$ is the universal gas constant. $\frac{\eta_1}{Z}$ is similar to previous, always $\frac{1}{4} < \frac{\eta_1}{Z}$ < 1.
