= Molybdopterin-synthase adenylyltransferase =

Identifiers
- EC no.: 2.7.7.80

Databases
- IntEnz: IntEnz view
- BRENDA: BRENDA entry
- ExPASy: NiceZyme view
- KEGG: KEGG entry
- MetaCyc: metabolic pathway
- PRIAM: profile
- PDB structures: RCSB PDB PDBe PDBsum
Search
- PMC: articles
- PubMed: articles
- NCBI: proteins

Molybdopterin-synthase adenylyltransferase (EC 2.7.7.80, MoeB, adenylyltransferase and sulfurtransferase MOCS3) is an enzyme with systematic name ATP:molybdopterin-synthase adenylyltransferase. This enzyme catalyses the following chemical reaction

ATP + [molybdopterin-synthase sulfur-carrier protein]-Gly-Gly $\rightleftharpoons$ diphosphate + [molybdopterin-synthase sulfur-carrier protein]-Gly-Gly-AMP

This enzyme adenylates the C-terminus of the small subunit of the molybdopterin synthase.
