= Hsp104 =

Fungal protein found in Saccharomyces cerevisiae S288c

Heat shock protein 104

Identifiers
- Organism: Saccharomyces cerevisiae
- Symbol: HSP104
- Entrez: 850633
- Orthologs: NCBI: entry; OMA: entry
- PDB: 5VJH
- RefSeq (mRNA): 1NM_001181846.1
- RefSeq (Prot): NP_013074.
- UniProt: P31539

Other data
- Chromosome: XII: 0.09 - 0.09 Mb
Search for
- Structures: Swiss-model
- Domains: InterPro

Hsp104 is a heat-shock protein. It is known to reverse toxicity of mutant α-synuclein, TDP-43, FUS, and TAF15 in yeast cells. Conserved in prokaryotes (ClpB), fungi, plants and as well as animal mitochondria, there is yet to see hsp104 in multicellular animals. Hsp104 is classified as a. AAA+ ATPases and a subgroup of Hsp100/Clp, because of the usage of Atp hydrolysis for structural modulation of other proteins. Hsp104 is not needed for normal cell growth but when exposed to stress there is an increasing amount. Removing the aggregates without the hsp104 is insufficient there highlighting the importance of this heat shock protein and its interactions.

== Structure ==
Hsp104 monomer is composed of two NBDs (Nucleotide Binding Sites) NBD1 and NBD2 which communicate through allosteric communication. Located on the C-terminus of NBD1 there are around 125 residues that link both NBDs. In hsp104 NBD1 is where ATP hydrolysis occurs, NBD2 C-terminus is shown to express the configuration of the structure by nucleotide-dependent hexamerazation. These NBDs have diaphragms, which are conserved loops that interact in the middle of the channel inside the chaperone by coupling the ATP hydrolysis and polypeptide transport. Coupling of this reaction is needed as without the coupling it is an energetically unfavorable reaction. These conserved loops contain conserved Tyr residues that are crucial for binding to substrates.

The Hsp104 homohexamer (Figure A) is a part of an unfolding/threading mechanism that aggregates pass through and single polypeptides are extracted. Presence of ATP, ADP allows the formation of the Hsp104 monomers to homohexamer complexes. Through the hexamer complex, the monomers communicate and make ATPhydrolysis from hsp104 hexamerization. This ATP hydrolysis allows hsp104 to interact with substrates.

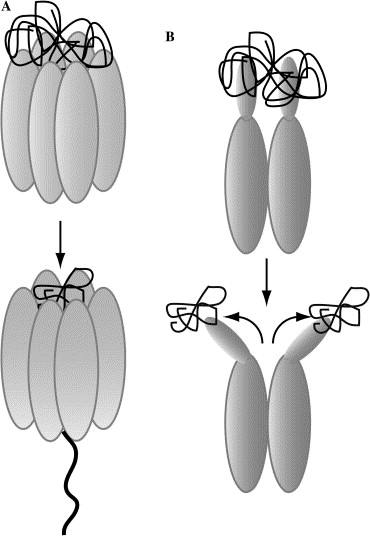
Figure A. Hsp104 Hexamer is encountering an aggregate with a chaperone it is able to extract the single polypeptides. For translocation to happen ATP hydrolysis is occurring and threading is happening to unfold proteins. Figure B. Demonstrates the crowbar model that changes shape due to conformational changes caused by the binding or hydrolysis of ATP breaking the protein aggregate. This is done in the middle of Hsp104 and later the released polypeptides can be refolded.

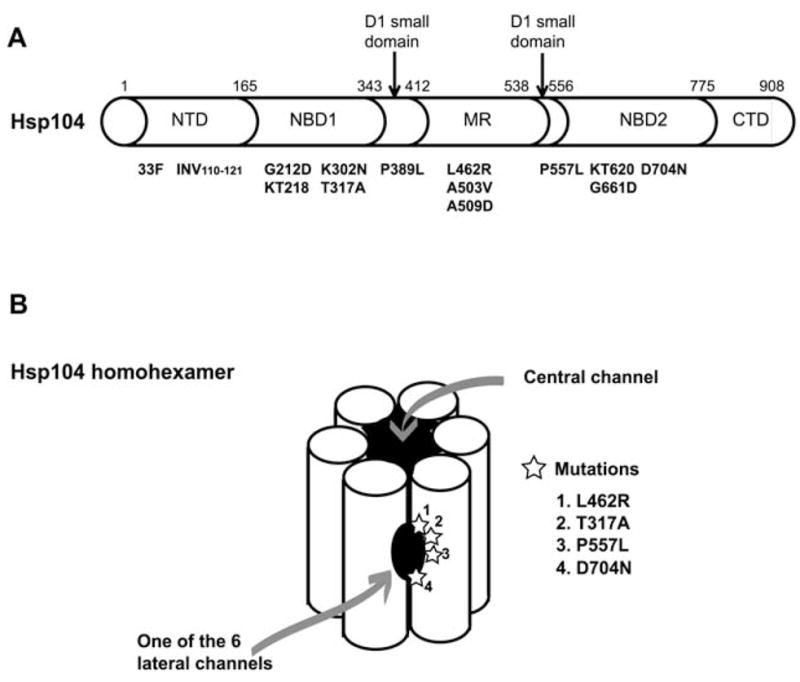
A. Is the monomer of Hsp 104 which is composed of the N-terminal domain. Then NBD1 is shown next and is connected to the NBD2 through the linkage of small domains and middle regions which would be the Tyr residuals. Lastly, you have your C-terminal domain. B. This is the homohexamers composed of six monomers of Hsp104 and this is where they are able to deal with stressors and interact with ATP hydrolysis.

== Expression inducers ==
Stressors that induce Hsp104 expression include:

- Heat or cold shock
- Hydrogen peroxide
- Ethanol
- Sodium Arsenide

== Interactions ==
=== Prion propagation ===
The role of Hsp104 when interaction with Sup35 Prion Propagation is to interact with polymers. When Hsp104 is elevated it is hypothesized that amyloid polymers can be solubilized in misfolded monomers or intermediates, then later can be refolded into non prion monomers. When there is normal amount of Hsp104 the polymer breaks down into oligomeric "seeds". Low levels of Hsp104 the polymer is not regulates forming aggregates within the cells that can lead to the cells death.

=== Amyloid fibrils ===
No fibril formation is seen at a concentration of 1uM of Hsp104. At low concentrations of Hsp104 there is an observed concentration-dependent delay. A lag phase is seen when the Hsp104 concentration is at .01u. This control lag phase being 9 hours but after the low concentration of Hsp104 it is seen to be 72 hours. When the amount of Hsp104 increased the lag phase also increased inhibition of the Fibril formation.

=== Dependencies of Hsp104 ===
Hsp104 influences prion inheritance in yeast by remolding amyloids. When this happens, prions infected show a cross-B structure and an amyloid fold. Hsp104 has a chaperone called Hsp70 in yeast and is dependent for the full efficiency of thermotolerence. When Hsp70 is not accompanied by hsp104 it more useful than if both Hsp's were gone. Hsp70 by itself can only do so much to regulate thermotolerance, Hsp104 is needed when internal levels of Hsp70 are reducing. Hsp104 and Hsp70 also interact to recover native state of proteins that were exposed to heat and formed aggregates. When there is too much Hsp70/40 disaggregation activity by Hsp104 increases. Small heat shock proteins (sHsps) are necessary for Hsp104 by helping with the clearance of aggregates. Some sHsps increase their molecular weight with partially folded proteins and are able to perform disaggregation by Hsp100/ClpB.
