= Glutathione peroxidase 7 =

Protein found in humans

GPX7
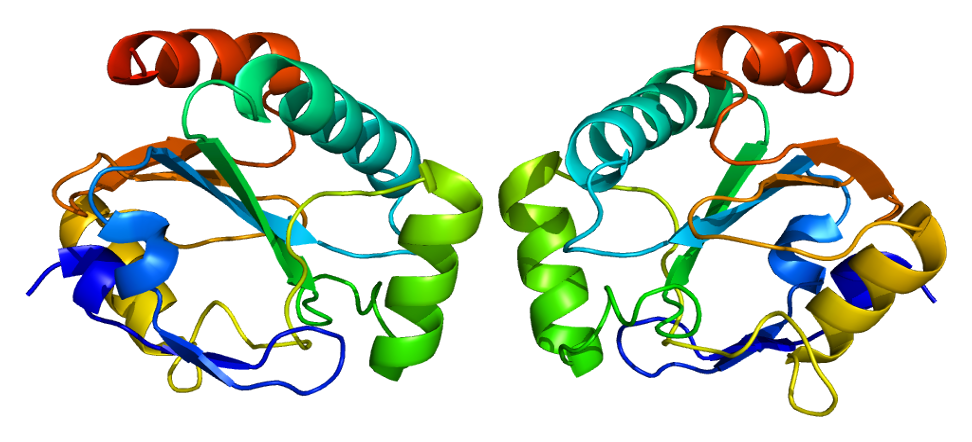

Identifiers
- Aliases: GPX7, CL683, GPX6, GPx-7, GSHPx-7, NPGPx, glutathione peroxidase 7
- External IDs: OMIM: 615784; MGI: 1914555; GeneCards: GPX7
Available structures
PDB	Ortholog search: PDBe RCSB
PDB	List of PDB id codes 2P31
Enzyme activity
EC #	BRENDA	ExPASy	KEGG	MetaCyc
5.3.4.1	↗	↗	↗	↗

Gene location (Human)
Chr.	Chromosome 1 (human)
Band	1p32.3	Start	52,602,371 bp
Band	1p32.3	End	52,609,051 bp

Gene location (Mouse)
Chr.	Chromosome 4 (mouse)
Band	4|4 C7	Start	108,257,587 bp
Band	4|4 C7	End	108,264,158 bp
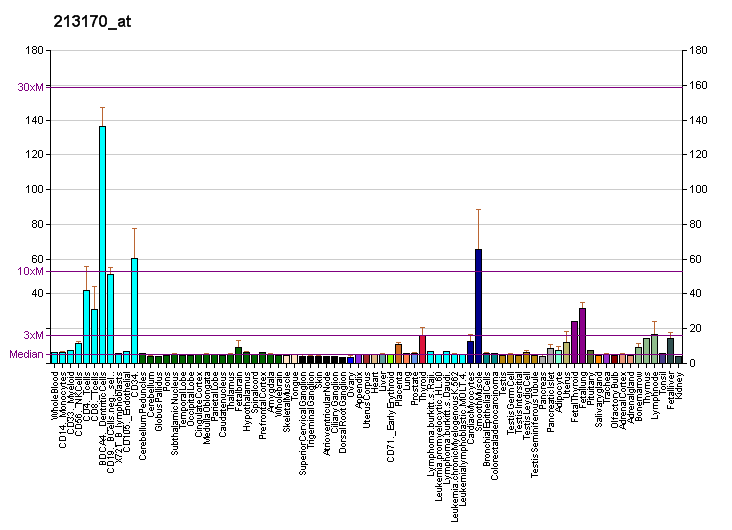
RNA expression pattern
Bgee	Human / Mouse (ortholog); Top expressed in: ventricular zone; cartilage tissue; ganglionic eminence; periodontal fiber; gallbladder; granulocyte; right lobe of thyroid gland; left lobe of thyroid gland; anterior pituitary; left uterine tube / Top expressed in: external naris; calvaria; dermis; intervertebral disc; efferent ductule; cervical vertebral column; external carotid artery; fossa; endocardial cushion; thoracic vertebral column; More reference expression data
BioGPS	More reference expression data
Gene ontology
Molecular function	oxidoreductase activity; glutathione peroxidase activity; catalase activity; protein binding; peroxidase activity
Cellular component	extracellular region; endoplasmic reticulum lumen; endoplasmic reticulum
Biological process	response to oxidative stress; cellular oxidant detoxification; cellular response to oxidative stress
Sources:Amigo / QuickGO
Orthologs
Databases	NCBI: entry; OMA: entry
Species	Human	Mouse
Entrez	2882	67305
Ensembl	ENSG00000116157	ENSMUSG00000028597
UniProt	Q96SL4	Q99LJ6
RefSeq (mRNA)	NM_015696	NM_024198
RefSeq (protein)	NP_056511	NP_077160
Location (UCSC)	Chr 1: 52.6 – 52.61 Mb	Chr 4: 108.26 – 108.26 Mb
PubMed search
- Wikidata
View/Edit Human	View/Edit Mouse

Glutathione peroxidase 7 is an enzyme that in humans is encoded by the GPX7 gene.
