= Hsp33 =

InterPro Family

Hsp33 protein

Identifiers
- Symbol: Hsp33
- Pfam: PF01430
- InterPro: IPR000397
Available protein structures:
- PDB: PDB: 1hw7 PDB: 1i7f PDB: 1vq0 PDB: 1vzy PDB: 1xjh IPR000397 PF01430 (ECOD; PDBsum)
- AlphaFold: IPR000397; PF01430

Hsp33 protein is a molecular chaperone, distinguished from all other known chaperones by its mode of functional regulation. Its activity is redox regulated. Hsp33 is a cytoplasmically localized protein with highly reactive cysteines that respond quickly to changes in the redox environment. Oxidizing conditions like H_{2}O_{2} cause disulphide bonds to form in Hsp33, a process that leads to the activation of its chaperone function.
