= UBL5 =

Protein-coding gene in the species Homo sapiens

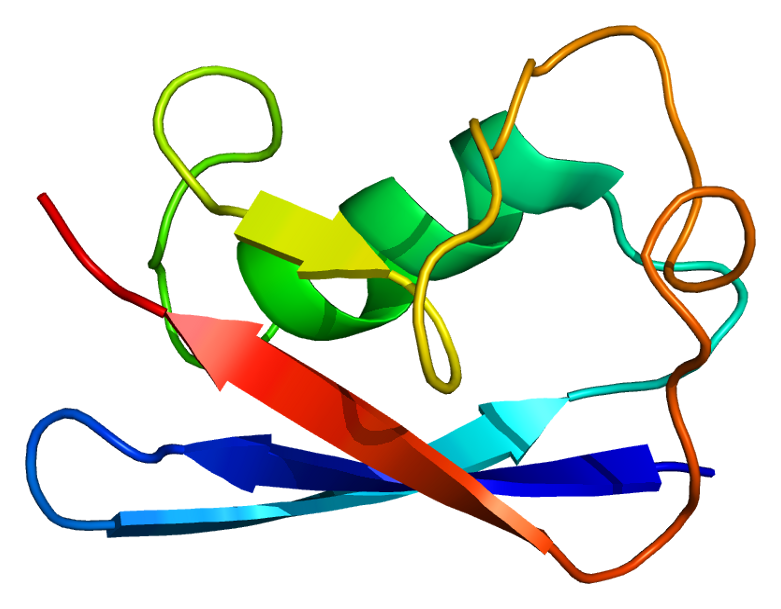
Available structures
PDB	Ortholog search: PDBe RCSB
PDB	List of PDB id codes 1P0R, 4PYU

Identifiers
- Aliases: UBL5, HUB1, ubiquitin like 5
- External IDs: OMIM: 606849; MGI: 1913427; HomoloGene: 83305; GeneCards: UBL5; OMA:UBL5 - orthologs

Gene location (Human)
Chr.	Chromosome 19 (human)
Band	19p13.2	Start	9,827,892 bp
Band	19p13.2	End	9,830,115 bp

Gene location (Mouse)
Chr.	Chromosome 9 (mouse)
Band	9|9 A3	Start	20,642,878 bp
Band	9|9 A3	End	20,647,140 bp
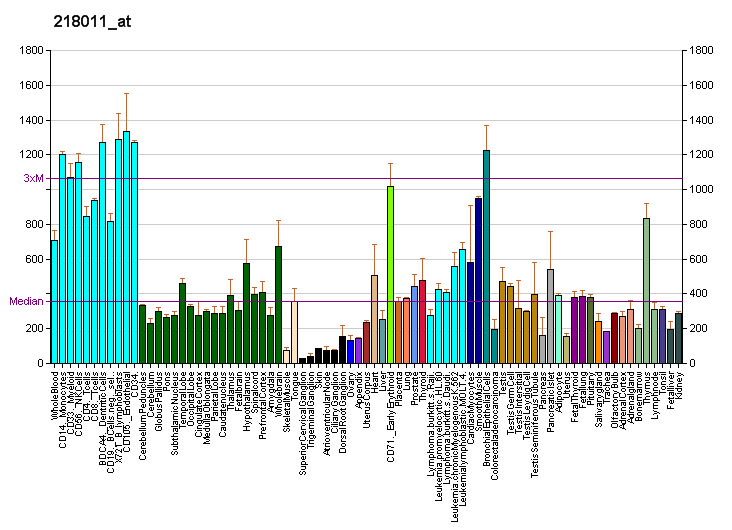
RNA expression pattern
Bgee	Human / Mouse (ortholog); Top expressed in: anterior pituitary; right testis; left testis; right adrenal gland; mucosa of transverse colon; left adrenal cortex; right adrenal cortex; C1 segment; anterior cingulate cortex; monocyte / Top expressed in: choroid plexus of fourth ventricle; interventricular septum; corneal stroma; ventricular zone; cardiac muscle tissue of left ventricle; yolk sac; lip; granulocyte; zygote; plantaris muscle; More reference expression data
BioGPS	More reference expression data
Gene ontology
Molecular function	protein binding; protein tag
Cellular component	cytoplasm; nucleus
Biological process	mRNA splicing, via spliceosome; positive regulation of protein targeting to mitochondrion
Sources:Amigo / QuickGO
Orthologs
Species	Human	Mouse
Entrez	59286	66177
Ensembl	ENSG00000198258	ENSMUSG00000084786
UniProt	Q9BZL1	Q9EPV8
RefSeq (mRNA)	NM_024292; NM_001048241	NM_025401; NM_001310746
RefSeq (protein)	NP_001041706; NP_077268; NP_001041706.1; NP_077268.1	NP_001297675; NP_079677; NP_001347954; NP_001347955; NP_001347956
Location (UCSC)	Chr 19: 9.83 – 9.83 Mb	Chr 9: 20.64 – 20.65 Mb
PubMed search
- Wikidata
View/Edit Human	View/Edit Mouse

Ubiquitin-like protein 5 is a protein that in humans is encoded by the UBL5 gene.

It has been shown that in C. elegans mitochondria treated to lower expression of certain electron transport chain proteins during the L3/L4 stage, its expression levels is higher leading to increased lifespans.

Ubiquitin-like proteins (UBLs) are thought to be reversible modulators of protein function rather than protein degraders like ubiquitin (MIM 191339).[supplied by OMIM]
