= Chaperone (protein) =

Class of enzymes

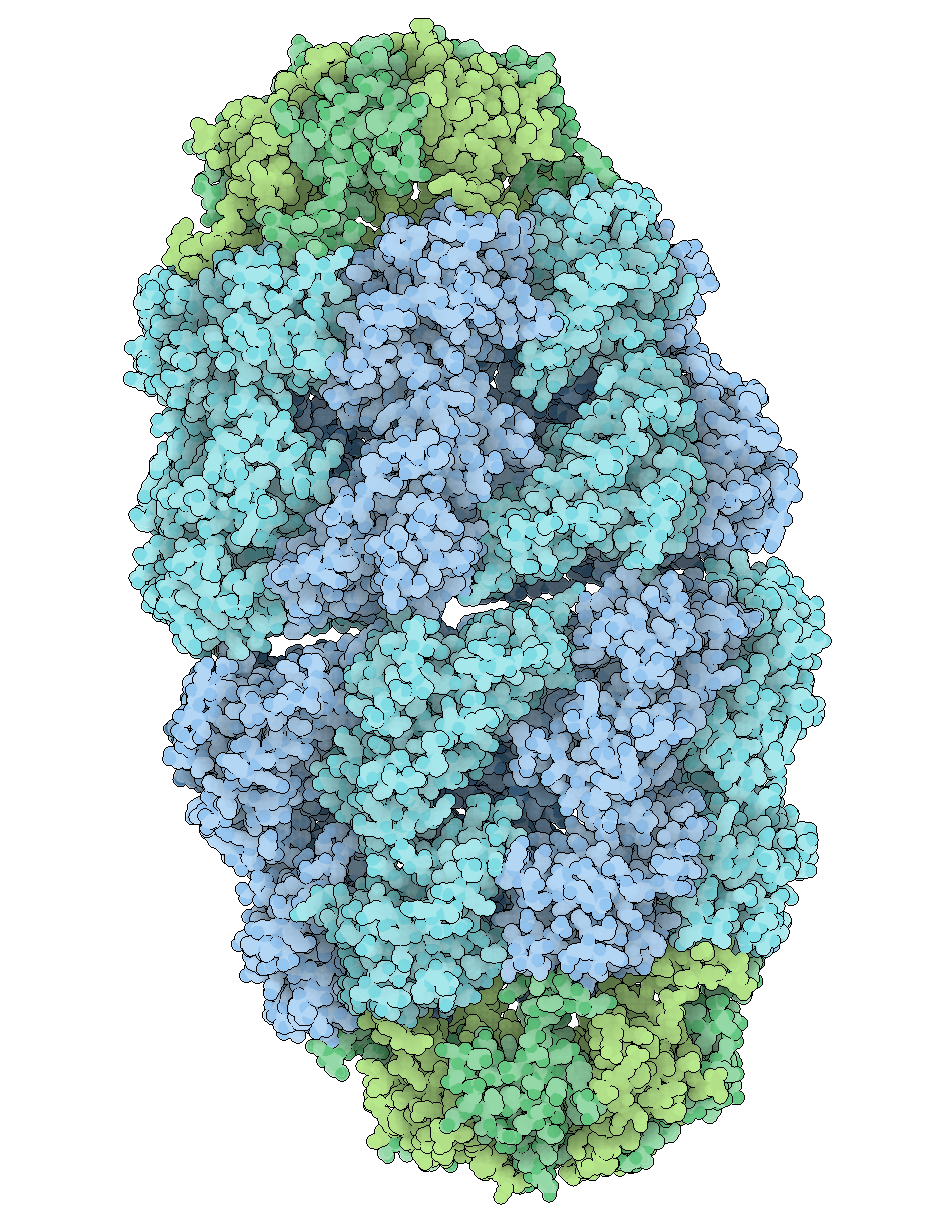
Molecular surface model of the human mitochondrial Hsp10-Hsp60 protein chaperone complex. (PDB: 9H5S)

In molecular biology, molecular chaperones are proteins that assist the conformational folding or unfolding of proteins or macromolecular protein complexes. There are a number of classes of molecular chaperones, all of which function to assist large proteins in proper protein folding during or after synthesis, and after partial denaturation. Chaperones are also involved in the translocation of proteins for proteolysis.

The first molecular chaperones discovered were a type of assembly chaperones which assist in the assembly of nucleosomes from folded histones and DNA. One major function of molecular chaperones is to prevent the aggregation of misfolded proteins, thus many chaperone proteins are classified as heat shock proteins, as the tendency for protein aggregation is increased by heat stress.

The majority of molecular chaperones do not convey any steric information for protein folding, and instead assist in protein folding by binding to and stabilizing folding intermediates until the polypeptide chain is fully translated. The specific mode of function of chaperones differs based on their target proteins and location. Various approaches have been applied to study the structure, dynamics and functioning of chaperones. Bulk biochemical measurements have informed us on the protein folding efficiency, and prevention of aggregation when chaperones are present during protein folding. Recent advances in single-molecule analysis have brought insights into structural heterogeneity of chaperones, folding intermediates and affinity of chaperones for unstructured and structured protein chains.

== Functions of molecular chaperones ==
Many chaperones are heat shock proteins, that is, proteins expressed in response to elevated temperatures or other cellular stresses. Heat shock protein chaperones are classified based on their observed molecular weights into Hsp60, Hsp70, Hsp90, Hsp104, and small Hsps. The Hsp60 family of protein chaperones are termed chaperonins, and are characterized by a stacked double-ring structure and are found in prokaryotes, in the cytosol of eukaryotes, and in mitochondria.

Some chaperone systems work as foldases: they support the folding of proteins in an ATP-dependent manner (for example, the GroEL/GroES or the DnaK/DnaJ/GrpE system). Although most newly synthesized proteins can fold in absence of chaperones, a minority strictly requires them for the same. Other chaperones work as holdases: they bind folding intermediates to prevent their aggregation, for example DnaJ or Hsp33. Chaperones can also work as disaggregases, which interact with aberrant protein assemblies and revert them to monomers. Some chaperones can assist in protein degradation, leading proteins to protease systems, such as the ubiquitin-proteasome system in eukaryotes. Chaperone proteins participate in the folding of over half of all mammalian proteins.

Macromolecular crowding may be important in chaperone function. The crowded environment of the cytosol can accelerate the folding process, since a compact folded protein will occupy less volume than an unfolded protein chain. However, crowding can reduce the yield of correctly folded protein by increasing protein aggregation. Crowding may also increase the effectiveness of the chaperone proteins such as GroEL, which could counteract this reduction in folding efficiency. Some highly specific 'steric chaperones' convey unique structural information onto proteins, which cannot be folded spontaneously. Such proteins violate Anfinsen's dogma, requiring protein dynamics to fold correctly.

Other types of chaperones are involved in transport across membranes, for example membranes of the mitochondria and endoplasmic reticulum (ER) in eukaryotes. A bacterial translocation-specific chaperone SecB maintains newly synthesized precursor polypeptide chains in a translocation-competent (generally unfolded) state and guides them to the translocon.

New functions for chaperones continue to be discovered, such as bacterial adhesin activity, induction of aggregation towards non-amyloid aggregates, suppression of toxic protein oligomers via their clustering, and in responding to diseases linked to protein aggregation and cancer maintenance.

== Human chaperone proteins ==
In human cell lines, chaperone proteins were found to make up ~10% of the gross proteome mass, and are ubiquitously and highly expressed across human tissues.

Chaperones are found extensively in the endoplasmic reticulum (ER), since protein synthesis often occurs in this area.

=== Endoplasmic reticulum ===
In the endoplasmic reticulum (ER) there are general, lectin- and non-classical molecular chaperones that moderate protein folding.

- General chaperones: GRP78/BiP, GRP94, GRP170.
- Lectin chaperones: calnexin and calreticulin
- Non-classical molecular chaperones: HSP47 and ERp29
- Folding chaperones:
  - Protein disulfide isomerase (PDI),
  - Peptidyl prolyl cis-trans isomerase (PPI), Prolyl isomerase
  - ERp57

== Nomenclature and examples of chaperone families ==
There are many different families of chaperones; each family acts to aid protein folding in a different way. In bacteria like E. coli, many of these proteins are highly expressed under conditions of high stress, for example, when the bacterium is placed in high temperatures, thus heat shock protein chaperones are the most extensive.

A variety of nomenclatures are in use for chaperones. As heat shock proteins, the names are classically formed by "Hsp" followed by the approximate molecular mass in kilodaltons; such names are commonly used for eukaryotes such as yeast. The bacterial names have more varied forms, and refer directly to their apparent function at discovery. For example, "GroEL" originally stands for "phage growth defect, overcome by mutation in phage gene E, large subunit".

=== Hsp10 and Hsp60 ===
Hsp10/60 (GroEL/GroES complex in E. coli) is the best characterized large (~ 1 MDa) chaperone complex. GroEL (Hsp60) is a double-ring 14mer with a hydrophobic patch at its opening; it is so large it can accommodate native folding of 54-kDa GFP in its lumen. GroES (Hsp10) is a single-ring heptamer that binds to GroEL in the presence of ATP or ADP. GroEL/GroES may not be able to undo previous aggregation, but it does compete in the pathway of misfolding and aggregation. Also acts in the mitochondrial matrix as a molecular chaperone.

=== Hsp70 and Hsp40 ===
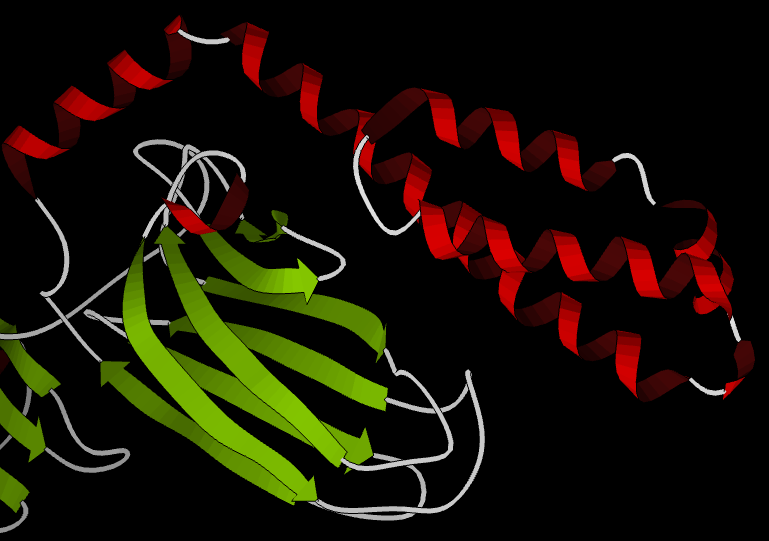
hsp70 pocket for substrate binding

Hsp70 (DnaK in E. coli) is perhaps the best characterized small (~ 70 kDa) chaperone. The Hsp70 proteins are aided by Hsp40 proteins (DnaJ in E. coli), which increase the ATP consumption rate and activity of the Hsp70s. The two proteins are named "Dna" in bacteria because they were initially identified as being required for E. coli DNA replication.

It has been noted that increased expression of Hsp70 proteins in the cell results in a decreased tendency toward apoptosis. Although a precise mechanistic understanding has yet to be determined, it is known that Hsp70s have a high-affinity bound state to unfolded proteins when bound to ADP, and a low-affinity state when bound to ATP.

It is thought that many Hsp70s crowd around an unfolded substrate, stabilizing it and preventing aggregation until the unfolded molecule folds properly, at which time the Hsp70s lose affinity for the molecule and diffuse away. Hsp70 also acts as a mitochondrial and chloroplastic molecular chaperone in eukaryotes.

=== Hsp90 ===
Hsp90 (HtpG in E. coli (Note: Initially identified as Drosophilia Hsp83 homologue. Name stands for "high temperature protein G".)) may be the least understood chaperone. Its molecular weight is about 90 kDa, and it is necessary for viability in eukaryotes (possibly for prokaryotes as well). Heat shock protein 90 (Hsp90) is a molecular chaperone essential for activating many signaling proteins in the eukaryotic cell.

Each Hsp90 has an ATP-binding domain, a middle domain, and a dimerization domain. Originally thought to clamp onto their substrate protein (also known as a client protein) upon binding ATP, the recently published structures by Vaughan et al. and Ali et al. indicate that client proteins may bind externally to both the N-terminal and middle domains of Hsp90.

Hsp90 may also require co-chaperones-like immunophilins, Sti1, p50 (Cdc37), and Aha1, and also cooperates with the Hsp70 chaperone system.

=== Hsp100 ===
Hsp100 (Clp family in E. coli) proteins have been studied in vivo and in vitro for their ability to target and unfold tagged and misfolded proteins.

Proteins in the Hsp100/Clp family form large hexameric structures with unfoldase activity in the presence of ATP. These proteins are thought to function as chaperones by processively threading client proteins through a small 20 Å (2 nm) pore, thereby giving each client protein a second chance to fold.

Some of these Hsp100 chaperones, like ClpA and ClpX, associate with the double-ringed tetradecameric serine protease ClpP; instead of catalyzing the refolding of client proteins, these complexes are responsible for the targeted destruction of tagged and misfolded proteins.

Hsp104, the Hsp100 of Saccharomyces cerevisiae, is essential for the propagation of many yeast prions. Deletion of the HSP104 gene results in cells that are unable to propagate certain prions.

== Bacteriophage ==
The genes of bacteriophage (phage) T4 that encode proteins with a role in determining phage T4 structure were identified using conditional lethal mutants. Most of these proteins proved to be either major or minor structural components of the completed phage particle. However among the gene products (gps) necessary for phage assembly, Snustad identified a group of gps that act catalytically rather than being incorporated themselves into the phage structure. These gps were gp26, gp31, gp38, gp51, gp28, and gp4 [gene 4 is synonymous with genes 50 and 65, and thus the gp can be designated gp4(50)(65)]. The first four of these six gene products have since been recognized as being chaperone proteins. Additionally, gp40, gp57A, gp63 and gpwac have also now been identified as chaperones.

Phage T4 morphogenesis is divided into three independent pathways: the head, the tail and the long tail fiber pathways as detailed by Yap and Rossman. With regard to head morphogenesis, chaperone gp31 interacts with the bacterial host chaperone GroEL to promote proper folding of the major head capsid protein gp23. Chaperone gp40 participates in the assembly of gp20, thus aiding in the formation of the connector complex that initiates head procapsid assembly. Gp4(50)(65), although not specifically listed as a chaperone, acts catalytically as a nuclease that appears to be essential for morphogenesis by cleaving packaged DNA to enable the joining of heads to tails.

During overall tail assembly, chaperone proteins gp26 and gp51 are necessary for baseplate hub assembly. Gp57A is required for correct folding of gp12, a structural component of the baseplate short tail fibers.

Synthesis of the long tail fibers depends on the chaperone protein gp57A that is needed for the trimerization of gp34 and gp37, the major structural proteins of the tail fibers. The chaperone protein gp38 is also required for the proper folding of gp37. Chaperone proteins gp63 and gpwac are employed in attachment of the long tail fibers to the tail baseplate.

== History ==
The investigation of chaperones has a long history. The term "molecular chaperone" appeared first in the literature in 1978, and was invented by Ron Laskey to describe the ability of a nuclear protein called nucleoplasmin to prevent the aggregation of folded histone proteins with DNA during the assembly of nucleosomes. The term was later extended by R. John Ellis in 1987 to describe proteins that mediated the post-translational assembly of protein complexes. In 1988, it was realised that similar proteins mediated this process in both prokaryotes and eukaryotes. The details of this process were determined in 1989, when the ATP-dependent protein folding was demonstrated in vitro.

== Clinical significance ==
There are many disorders associated with mutations in genes encoding chaperones (i.e. multisystem proteinopathy) that can affect muscle, bone and/or the central nervous system.

== See also ==
- Biological machines
- Chaperome
- Chaperonin
- Chemical chaperones
- Heat shock protein
- Heat shock factor 1
- Metallochaperones
- Molecular chaperone therapy
- Pharmacoperones
- Proteasome
- Protein dynamics

Media related to Chaperone proteins at Wikimedia Commons
