= Position (obstetrics) =

Fetal position in the womb

In obstetrics, position is the orientation of the fetus in the womb, identified by the location of the presenting part of the fetus relative to the pelvis of the mother. Conventionally, it is the position assumed by the fetus before the process of birth, as the fetus assumes various positions and postures during the course of childbirth.

== Positions ==
Depending upon which part of the fetus is expected to be delivered first (fetal presentation), there are many possible positions:

- Vertex presentation with longitudinal lie:

Name	Abb.	Description
Left occipitoanterior	LOA	occiput, (Note: Occiput is the prominence of the back of the head) as against the buttocks, is close to the vagina (hence known as vertex presentation) faces anteriorly (forward with mother standing) and towards left. This is the most common position and lie.
Right occipitoanterior	ROA	occiput faces anteriorly and towards right. Less common than LOA, but not associated with labor complications.
Left occipitoposterior		occiput faces posteriorly (behind) and towards left.
Right occipitoposterior	ROP	occiput faces posteriorly and towards right.
Occipitoanterior		occiput faces anteriorly (absolutely straight without any turning to any of the sides)
Occipitoposterior		occiput faces posteriorly (absolutely straight without any turning to any of the sides)
Left occipitotransverse	LOT	occiput faces left
Right occipitotransverse	ROT	occiput faces right

- Breech presentation with longitudinal lie:
1. Left sacrum anterior (LSA)—the buttocks, as against the occiput of the vertex presentation, like close to the vagina (hence known as breech presentation), which lie anteriorly and towards the left.
2. Right sacrum anterior (RSA)—the buttocks face anteriorly and towards the right.
3. Left sacrum posterior (LSP)—the buttocks face posteriorly and towards the left.
4. Right sacrum posterior (RSP)—the buttocks face posteriorly and towards right.
5. Sacrum anterior (SA)—the buttocks face anteriorly.
6. Sacrum posterior (SP)—the buttocks face posteriorly.
- Shoulder presentation with transverse lie are classified into four types, based on the location of the scapula (shoulderblade); note: the presentation is significantly different from asynclitic positioning, and in most cases needs to be delivered by cesarean section.
1. Left scapula-anterior (LSA)
2. Right scapula-anterior (RSA)
3. Left scapula-posterior (LSP)
4. Right scapula-posterior (RSP)

== See also ==
- Cephalic presentation
- Child birth
- Fetal position
- Fetal relations
- Presentation
