= Robson classification =

Childbirth classification system

The Robson classification, also known as the 10-groups classification or ten groups classification system (TGCS), is a system for classifying pregnant women who undergo childbirth. It was developed to allow more accurate comparison of caesarean section rates between different settings, whether they be individual hospitals or entire regions or countries. Endorsed by the World Health Organization in 2015, it differs from other classification systems in that it accounts for all women who undergo delivery, and not just those who proceed to cesarean section.

The ten mutually-exclusive groups were first described by the obstetrician Michael Robson in 2001, and are defined based on the category of the pregnancy, the woman's previous obstetric record, the course of the labour and delivery, and the gestational age at delivery.

1. Nulliparous, single cephalic pregnancy, at least 37 weeks' gestation, spontaneous labour
2. Nulliparous, single cephalic pregnancy, at least 37 weeks' gestation, with either induced labour or a cesarean section prior to the onset of spontaneous labour
3. Multiparous, no previous caesarean section, single cephalic pregnancy, at least 37 weeks' gestation, spontaneous labour
4. Multiparous, no previous caesarean section, single cephalic pregnancy, at least 37 weeks' gestation, with either induced labour or a cesarean section prior to the onset of spontaneous labour
5. Previous caesarean section, single cephalic pregnancy, at least 37 weeks' gestation
6. Nulliparous, single breech pregnancy
7. Multiparous, single breech pregnancy
8. Multiple pregnancy
9. Single pregnancy with transverse or oblique lie
10. Single cephalic pregnancy, 36 weeks' gestation or less

The classification is increasingly used to monitor and compare rates of caesarean section in many countries, and some further subdivisions of the ten groups have been proposed.
