= Nufer =

Nufer is a surname. Notable people with the surname include:

- Jacob Nufer (fl. c. 1500), Swiss pig-gelder who reportedly performed the first successful Caesarean section
- Julius Nufer (1879–1949), American basketball coach
- Priska Nufer (born 1992), Swiss alpine ski racer
