= Caesarean delivery on maternal request =

Medically unnecessary caesarean section

- Specialty: Obstetrics

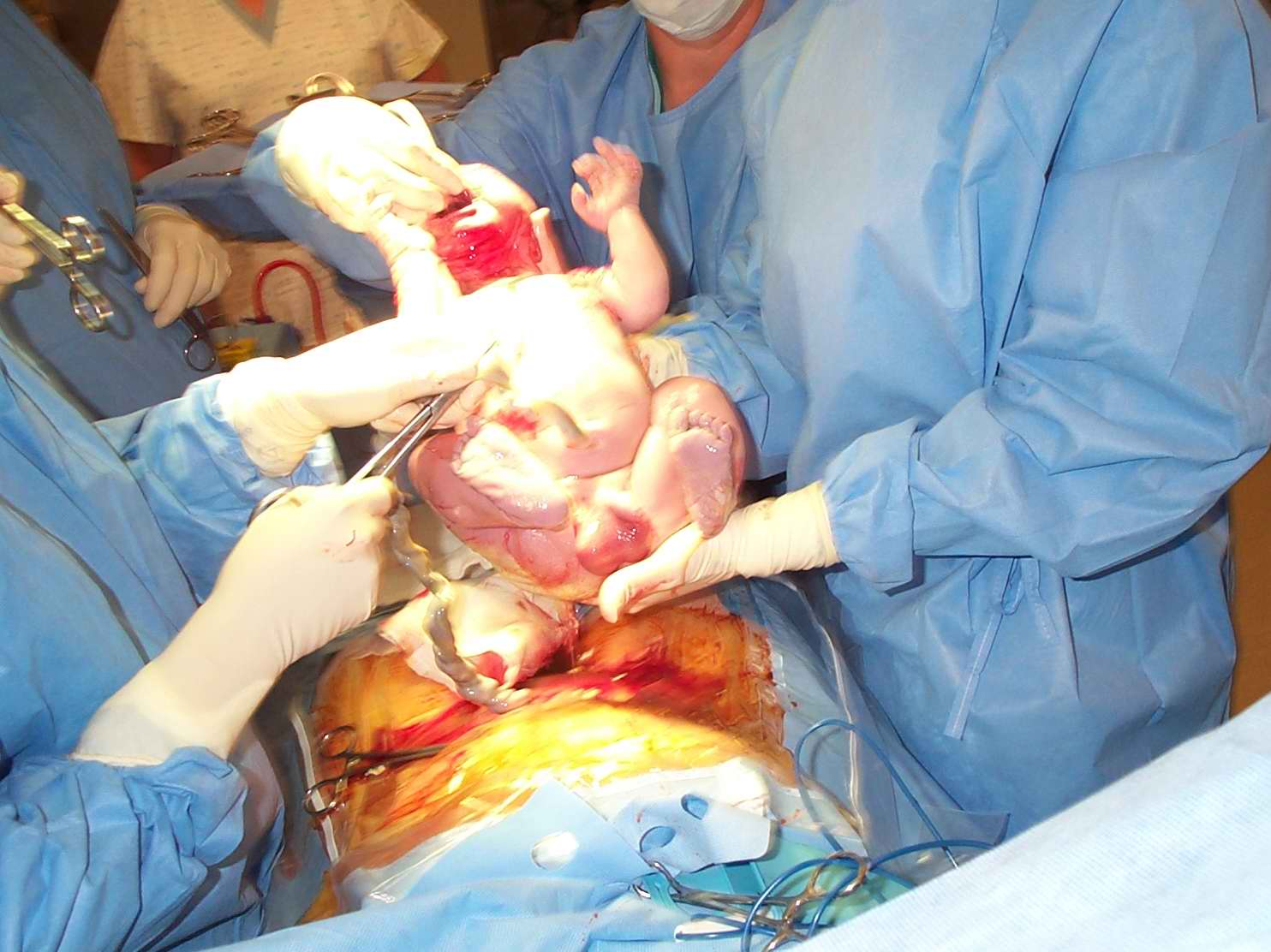
Birth by caesarian section

Caesarean delivery on maternal request (CDMR) is a caesarean section birth requested by the pregnant woman without a medical reason.

== Background ==
The concept of "Caesarean delivery on maternal request" (CDMR) is not well-recognized in health care, and consequently, when it occurs there are no mechanisms in place for reporting it for research or distinguishing it in medical billing.

Over the last century, delivery by Caesarean section (CS) has become increasingly safer; the medical reasons, therefore, for selecting a CS delivery over a vaginal birth are less likely to be those of necessity, and more likely to be motivated by other factors, such as considerations of pain in vaginal delivery and the effects of childbirth on vaginal muscle tone. Until recently, an elective caesarean section was done on the basis of medical grounds; however, the existence of CDMR makes the mother's preference the determining factor for the delivery mode.

An elective Caesarean will be agreed in advance. An elective Caesarean can be suggested by either the mother or her obstetrician, often as a result of a change in the medical status of the mother or baby. The term is used by the press and on the web in a number of different ways, but any Caesarean section which is not an emergency is classified as elective. The mother in essence has agreed to it but may not have chosen it.

The popular media suggest that many women are opting for Caesareans in the belief that it is a practical solution. The ethical view that a woman has the right to make decisions regarding her body has empowered women to make a choice regarding the method of her childbirth.

== Prevalence ==
The movement for CDMR may have started in Brazil. It has been estimated that possibly 4-18% of all CSs are done on maternal request; however, estimates are difficult to come by. The global nature of the CDMR phenomenon was underlined by a study that showed that in southeast China about 20% of women chose this mode of delivery.

== Maternal request ==
Increasingly, caesarean sections are performed in the absence of obstetrical or medical necessity at the patient's request, and the term Caesarean delivery on maternal request has been used. Another term that has been used is "planned elective cesarean section". As of 2006, there is no ICD code, thus the extent of the use of this indication is difficult to determine. The mother is the only party who may request such an intervention without indication.

Caesarean sections are in some cases performed for reasons other than medical necessity. These can vary, with a key distinction being between hospital- or doctor-centric reasons and mother-centric reasons. Critics of doctor-ordered Caesareans worry that Caesareans are in some cases performed because they are profitable for the hospital, because a quick Caesarean is more convenient for an obstetrician than a lengthy vaginal birth, or because it is easier to perform surgery at a scheduled time than to respond to nature's schedule and deliver a baby at an hour that is not predetermined. It is through these lenses that CDMR can sometimes be viewed as an example of unnecessary health care.

=== Routine hospital practices ===
Non-medically indicated scheduling of childbirth before 39 weeks gestation brings "significant risks for the baby with no known benefit to the mother." Hospitals should institute strict monitoring of births to comply with full term (more than 39 weeks gestation) elective C-section guidelines. In review, three hospitals following policy guidelines brought elective early deliveries down 64%, 57%, and 80%. The researchers found many benefits but "no adverse effects" in the health of the mothers and babies at those hospitals.

In this context, it is worth remembering many studies have shown operations performed out-of-hours tend to have more complications (both surgical and anaesthetic). For this reason, if a Caesarean is anticipated to be likely to be needed for a woman, it may be preferable to perform this electively (or pre-emptively) during daylight operating hours, rather than wait for it to become an emergency with the increased risk of surgical and anaesthetic complications that can follow from emergency surgery.

=== Doctor's fear of lawsuits ===
Another contributing factor for doctor-ordered procedures may be fear of medical malpractice lawsuits. Italian gynaecologist Enrico Zupi, whose clinic in Rome, Mater Dei, was under media attention for carrying a record of Caesarian sections (90% over total birth), explained: "We shouldn't be blamed. Our approach must be understood. We doctors are often sued for events and complications that cannot be classified as malpractice. So we turn to defensive medicine. We will keep acting this way as long as medical mistakes are not depenalized. We are not martyrs. So if a pregnant woman is facing an even minimum risk, we suggest she gets a C-section".

=== Mother's fear of vaginal birth ===
Studies of United States women have indicated married white women giving birth in private hospitals are more likely to have a Caesarean section than poorer women, although they are less likely to have complications that may lead to a Caesarean section being required. The women in these studies have indicated their preference for Caesarean section is more likely to be partly due to considerations of pain and vaginal tone. In contrast, a 2004 study in the British Medical Journal retrospectively analysed a large number of Caesarean sections in England and stratified them by social class. Their finding was Caesarean sections are not more likely in women of higher social class than in women in other classes. Some have suggested, due to the comparative risks of Caesarean section with an uncomplicated vaginal delivery, women should be discouraged or forbidden from choosing it.

Some 42% of obstetricians believe the media and women are responsible for the rising Caesarean section rates. A study conducted in Sweden, however, concludes that relatively few women wish to deliver by Caesarean section.

== Reducing unnecessary caesarean sections ==
Requirements for a second opinion from an additional doctor before giving a caesarean section has a small effect on reducing the rate of unnecessary caesarean sections. Communities of health care providers who peer review each other and come to agreement about the necessity of caesarean sections tend to use them less frequently. When medical guidelines are shared by local community leaders which mothers trust, then those mothers are more likely to have vaginal delivery after having had a previous caesarean delivery. When mothers have access to childbirth classes and relaxation classes mothers are more likely to use vaginal delivery when the pregnancy is otherwise low risk.

== Controversy ==
A meeting of experts sponsored by the NIH in March, 2006 attempted to address the medical issues and found "insuffient evidence to evaluate fully the benefits and risks" of CDMR versus vaginal delivery, and thus was not able to come to a consensus about the general advisability of a cesarean delivery by demand. The available evidence suggests certain differences as follows:

Proponents for CDMR point out that it facilitates the birth process by performing it at a scheduled time under controlled circumstances, with typically less bleeding, and less risk of trauma to the baby. Furthermore, there is some evidence that urinary stress incontinence as a long-term result of damage to the pelvic floor is increased after vaginal birth. Opponents to CS feel that it is not natural, that the costs are higher, infection rates are higher, hospitalization longer, and rates for breastfeeding decrease. Also, once a CS has been done, subsequent deliveries will likely be also by CS, each time at a somewhat higher risk. Further, babies born after a vaginal delivery tend to be at a lower risk for the infant respiratory distress syndrome.

Subsequent to the NIH report a large review from the USA of almost 6 million births was published that suggested that neonatal mortality is 184% higher in babies born by cesarean section. This study was harshly criticized for excluding cases where unforeseen complications arose during labor from its cohort of vaginal deliveries, thereby retrospectively removing poor outcomes and artificially lowering the neonatal mortality rate in the vaginal delivery population, and for using birth certificate data instead of more reliable documentation, such as hospital discharge forms, to define cesarean sections with "no indicated risk", and thereby inappropriately including emergent cesarean sections in their "elective cesarean" cohort. In response to this criticism, the authors published a second paper analyzing the same cohort, in which they did not systematically exclude vaginal deliveries in which unexpected complications arose, and concluded that the increased risk of neonatal mortality associated with cesarean section was 69%, rather than 184%. However, they did not address the inadequacies of their data set, and did not attempt to determine the degree of error introduced when identifying elective cesarean sections by birth certificate. A study published in the February 13, 2007 issue of the Canadian Medical Association Journal found that between 1991 and 2005, women who had scheduled cesarean sections for breech birth had a 2.7% rate of severe morbidity, compared with 0.9% for women who had planned vaginal deliveries.
