= Justine Siegemund =

German midwife (1636–1705)

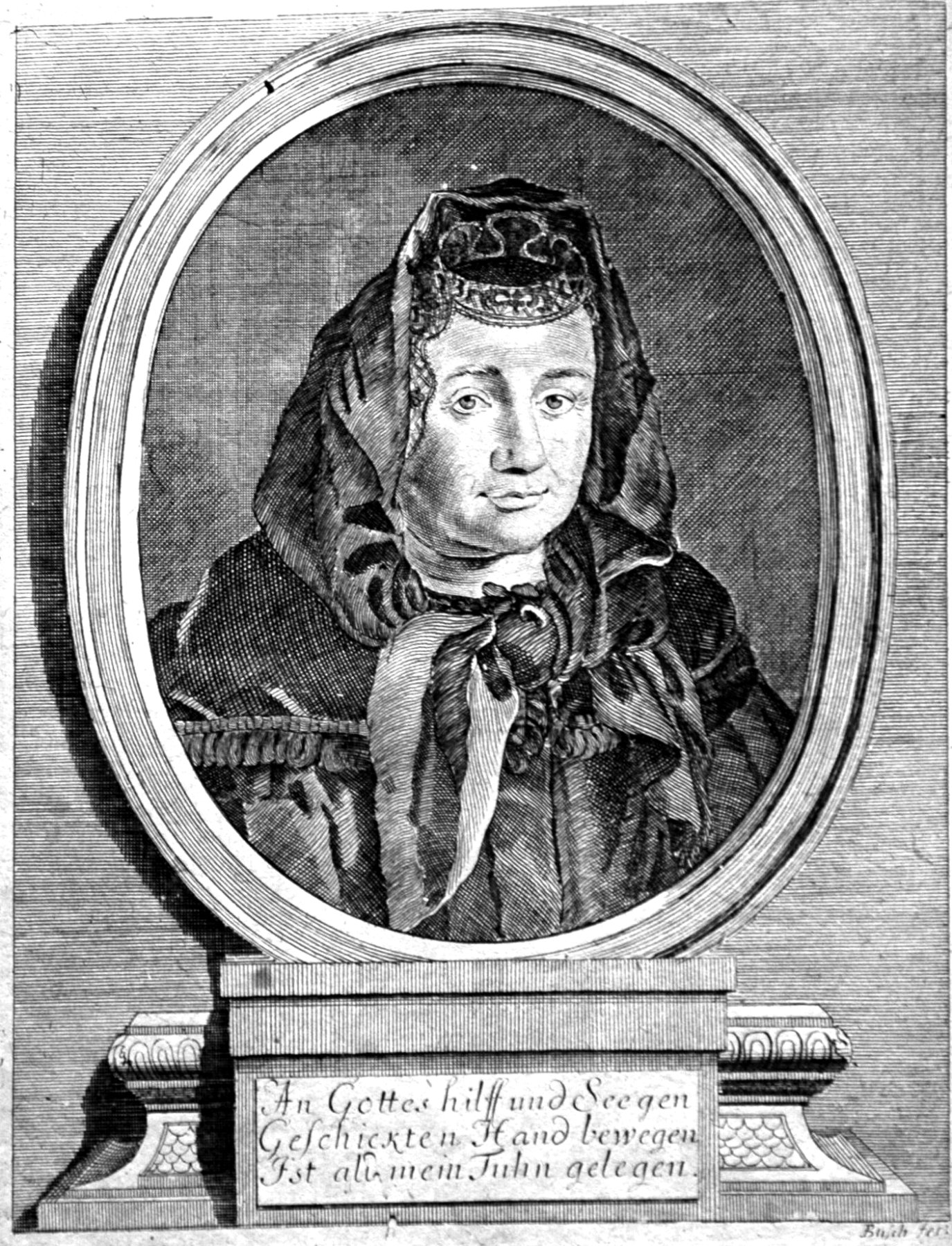
- Justine Siegemundin
- Born: Justine Diettrich; 26 December 1636; Rohnstock, Lower Silesia (now Roztoka, Poland)
- Died: 10 November 1705 (aged 68); Berlin, Kingdom of Prussia
- Occupation: Midwife
- Known for: The Court Midwife (1690)
- Spouse: Christian Siegemund
- Children: None

Justine Siegemund, or Siegemundin, (Note: The "-in" suffix is a gender-specific surname variant.) (born Justine Diettrich; 26 December 1636 – 10 November 1705) was a Silesian midwife. Her obstetrical book, The Court Midwife (1690), was the first German medical text written by a woman.

== Early life ==
Justine Diettrich was born on 26 December 1636, the daughter of Elias Diettrich, a Lutheran minister, in Rohnstock (now Roztoka, Poland), in the former Silesian Duchy of Jawor. Her father died in 1650 when she was 14 years old. In 1655, she married Christian Siegemund, an accountant. The couple remained childless through their 42 years of marriage and supported each other in their professional careers.

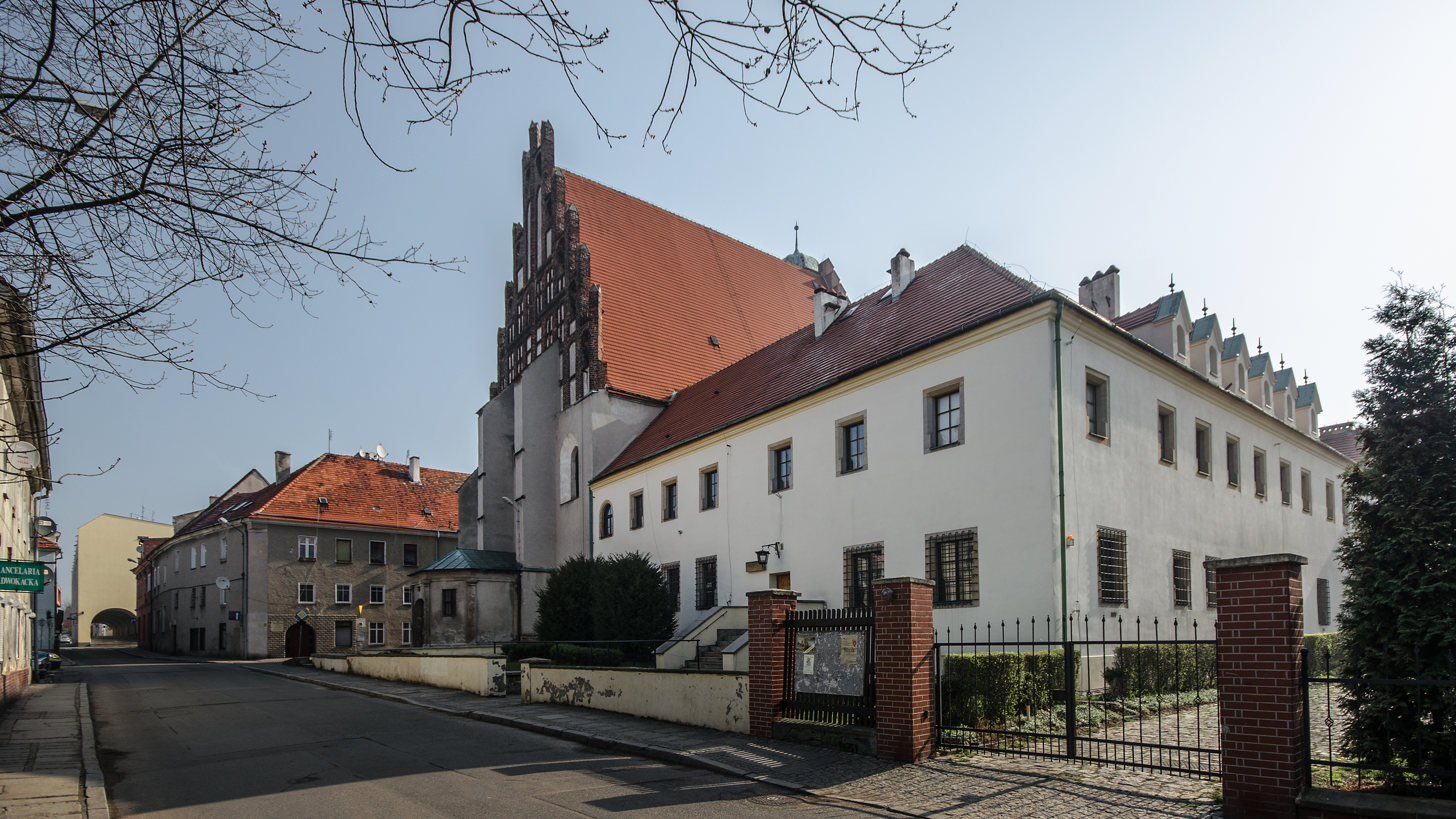
The capital of the Duchy of Jawor - view of one of the streets

== Career ==
=== 1656–1672 ===
At 20 years old, Justine suffered from a prolapsed uterus which went misdiagnosed. This painful experience motivated her to become educated about obstetrics, and she began her practice in 1659, when she was asked to assist a case of obstructed labour related to a misplaced fetal arm. Until 1670, she provided free midwifery services to poor women in her local area. Her paying client base grew to include merchant and noble families.

=== 1670–1701 ===
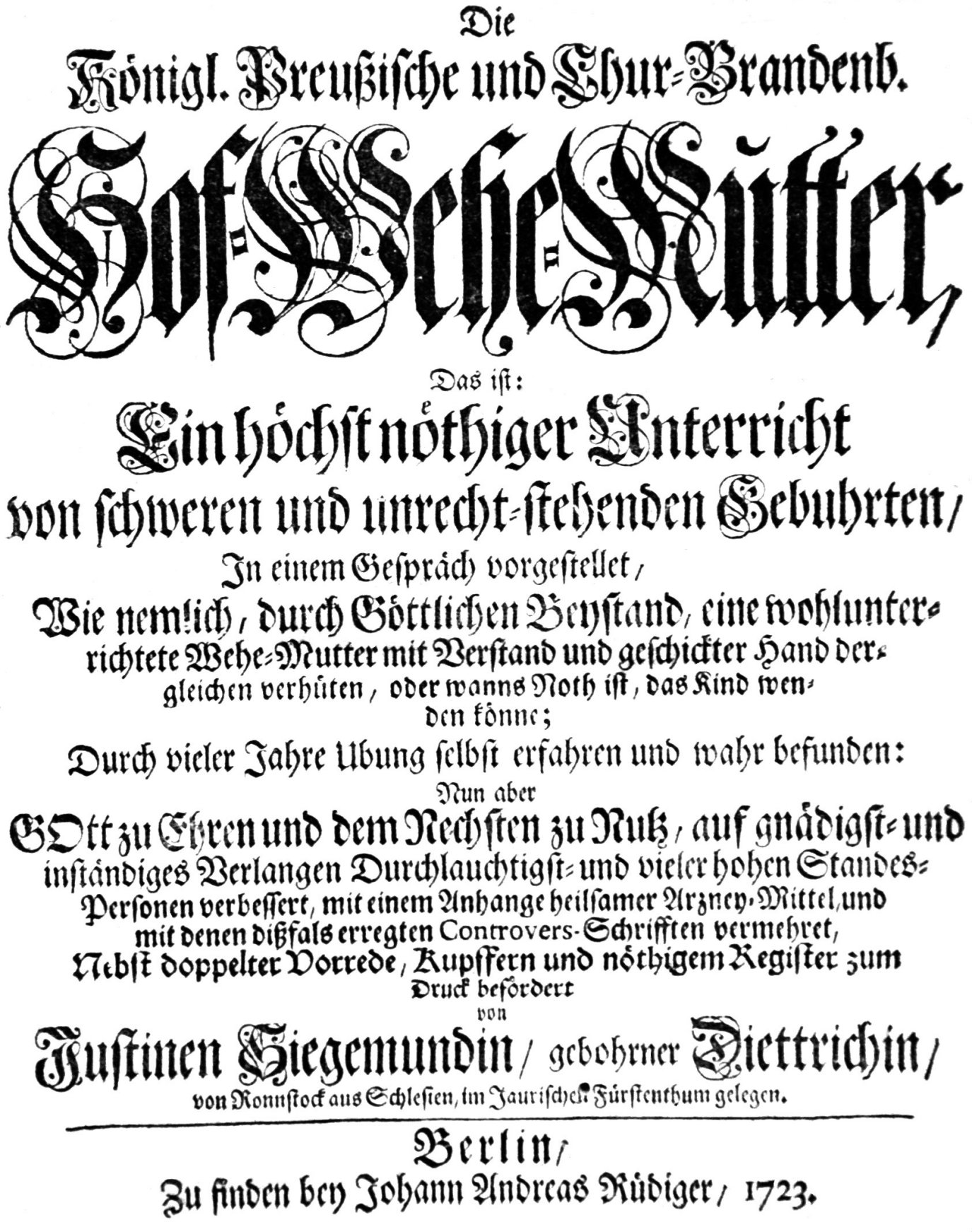
Titlepage of Siegismundin's textbook

In 1670, Siegemund was named the City Midwife of Legnica. Given her thriving midwife practice and expanding client base, Siegemund was called upon when a cervical tumour threatened Luise, Duchess of Legnica, which she successfully removed, after male physicians called on her professional services. The same year, Martin Kerger—her former supervisor—accused her of unsafe birthing practices. Kerger's colleagues at the Frankfurt on Oder medical faculty sided with Siegemund, and Kerger's own statements demonstrated that he lacked her practical experience-based professional knowledge of women's reproductive and infant anatomies and childbirth.

His allegations did not affect Siegemund's professional employment opportunities. Her expertise and dexterity caught the attention of Frederick William, Elector of Brandenburg, who appointed her as his court midwife in Berlin in 1683. She also served as royal midwife for Frederick I's sister Marie-Amalie, Duchess of Saxony-Zeitz, and delivered four of her children. At the court of Augustus the Strong in 1696, she assisted Saxon Electress Eberhardine at the birth of her son, Frederick Augustus II. At the same time, she attended other births within the Berlin area.

In Leipzig, Andreas Petermann charged her with similar offences to those that Kerger had already advanced, but given his comparative professional inexperience, Siegemund once again was able to surmount this challenge to her professional reputation.

Siegemund rarely used early pharmaceuticals or surgical instruments within her practice. By the time that she died on 10 November 1705 in Berlin, Siegemund had delivered almost 6,200 infants, according to the Berlin deacon who presided over her funeral.

=== The Court Midwife (1690) ===
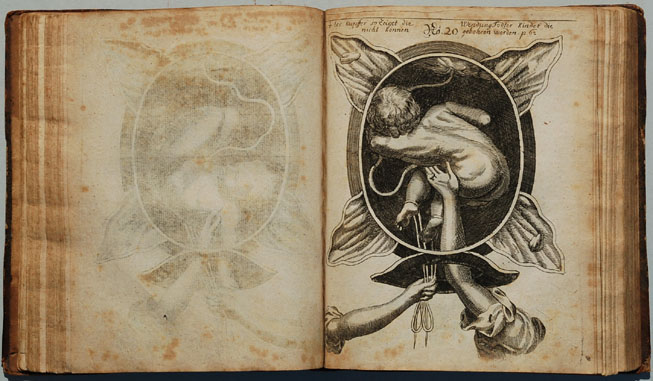
Two-handed internal version of a shoulder presentation

While in the Netherlands, Mary II of Orange suggested that Siegemund author a training manual for midwives. However, she had likely already started to compile The Court Midwife by this time.

In 1689, Siegemund travelled from The Hague to Frankfurt on Oder, and submitted her draft manual to the Frankfurt on Oder medical faculty, which approved her medical documentation. She had incorporated embryological and anatomical engravings from Regnier de Graaf and Govard Bidloo, which enhanced its practical utility. From April to June 1689, she protected her intellectual property stake in the volume through gaining printing privileges from the Electors of Brandenburg and Saxony, as well as the Holy Roman Emperor.

Based on careful notes that she had made during her deliveries, she published an authoritative obstetrical text titled The Court Midwife (German: Die Kgl. Preußische und Chur-Brandenburgische Hof-Wehemutter) in 1690. On 28 March 1690 the Alma Mater Viadrina certified her book. The book is written in the form of a dialogue between herself and Christina, a pupil. The Court Midwife was systematic and evidence-based in its presentation of possible childbirth complications, including problems like poor presentations, umbilical cord problems, and placenta previa and their management. In the textbook, Siegemund presented a solution to the delivery of a shoulder presentation, in those days an often catastrophic situation leading to the death of the baby and potentially the mother. She worked out a two-handed intervention to rotate the baby in the uterus, securing one extremity by a sling. She also is credited (along with François Mauriceau) of finding a method to deal with a hemorrhaging placenta previa by puncturing the amniotic sac.

After Siegemund's death, The Court Midwife went through numerous republications, including in Berlin (1708) and Leipzig (1715 and 1724), with modifications that included corroborative male gynecological citations. Republications in 1723, 1741, 1752 and 1756 also included accounts of the Kerger and Petermann cases.

== Works ==
- Die königl[ich-]preußische und chur-brandenb[urgische] Hof-Wehe-Mutter : das ist: ein höchst nöthiger Unterricht von schweren und unrecht stehenden Gebuhrten, in einem Gespräch vorgestellet, wie nemlich durch göttlichen Beystand, eine wohl-unterrichtete Wehe-Mutter mit Verstand und geschickter Hand dergleichen verhüten, oder wanns Noth ist, das Kind wenden könne; mit einem Anhange heilsamer Arzney-Mittel und ... Controvers-Schriften vermehret .... Berlin: Rüdiger, 1723 Digital edition of the University and State Library Düsseldorf.
