= Fetal position =

Positioning of the body of a foetus as it develops

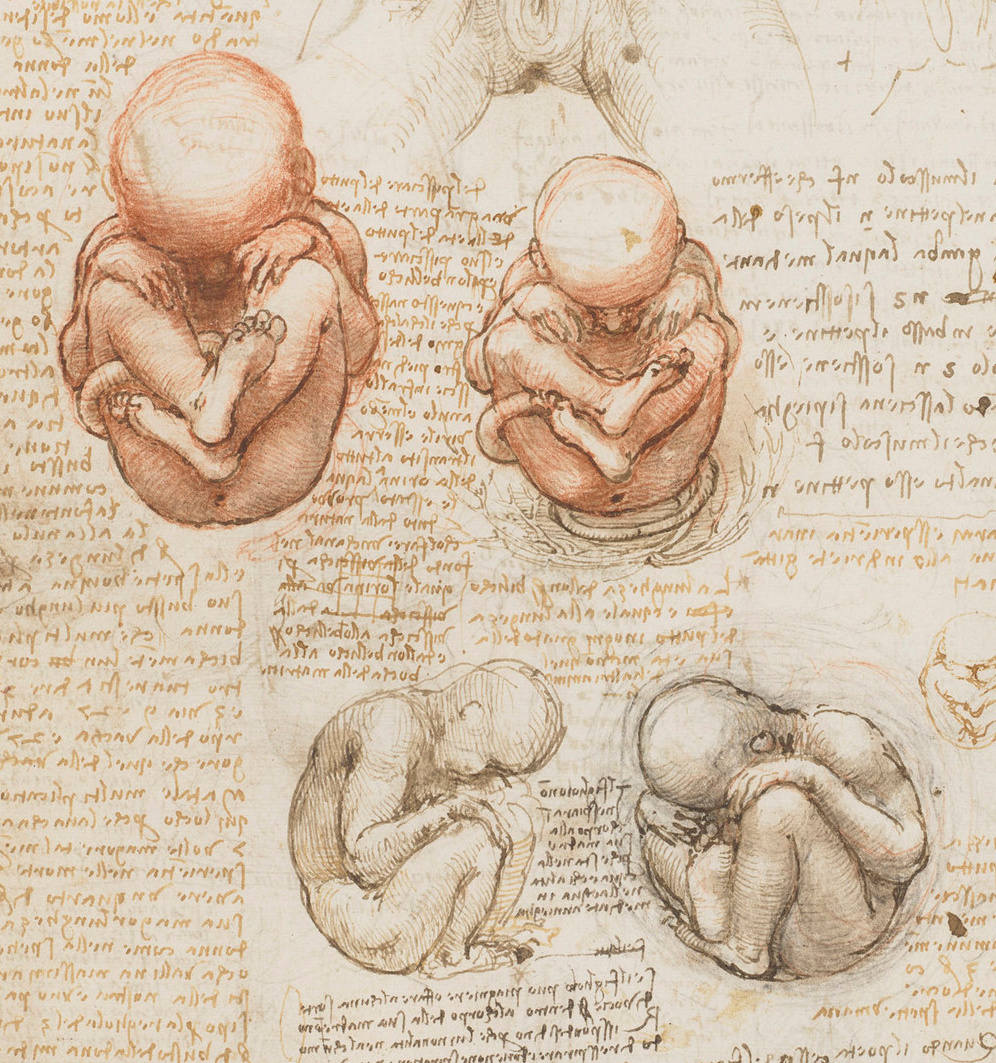
"Views of a Foetus in the Womb", Leonardo da Vinci, ca. 1510–1512

Fetal position (British English: also foetal) is the positioning of the body of a prenatal fetus as it develops. In this position, the back is curved, the head is bowed, and the limbs are bent and drawn up to the torso. A compact position is typical for fetuses. Many newborn mammals, especially rodents, remain in a fetal position well after birth. This type of compact position and prophylactic manual rotation is used in the medical profession to minimize injury to the mother in labor and infant during childbirth without the need for operative delivery.

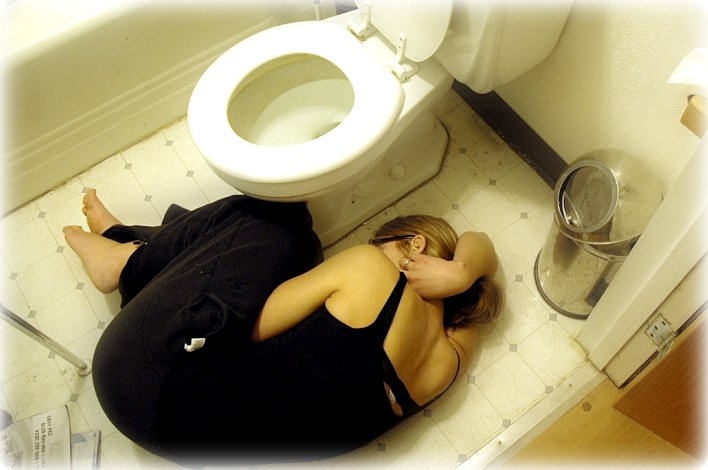
A nauseated woman lying in a fetal position

Most people assume a fetal or semi-fetal position when sleeping. It is a type of lateral lying position. Curling up maintains contact with oneself and covers vulnerable parts of the body which can be interpreted as self-soothing. It also conserves heat during sleep.

In post-traumatic stress disorder (PTSD), curling into a fetal position can occur as a somatic symptom of a flashback. This type of position has been observed in drug addicts, who enter the position when experiencing withdrawal. Sufferers of anxiety are also known to assume the same type of position during panic attacks. Stomach pain may be relieved by taking up a fetal position to relax stomach muscles and provide relief from bloating.

Assuming this type of position and playing dead is often recommended as a strategy to end a bear attack. In extreme cold, body heat can be preserved by curling together.

In some cultures, bodies have been buried in fetal position.

== See also ==
- Neutral body posture
- Position (obstetrics)
