= Presentation (obstetrics) =

Part of a fetus which will emerge first upon birth

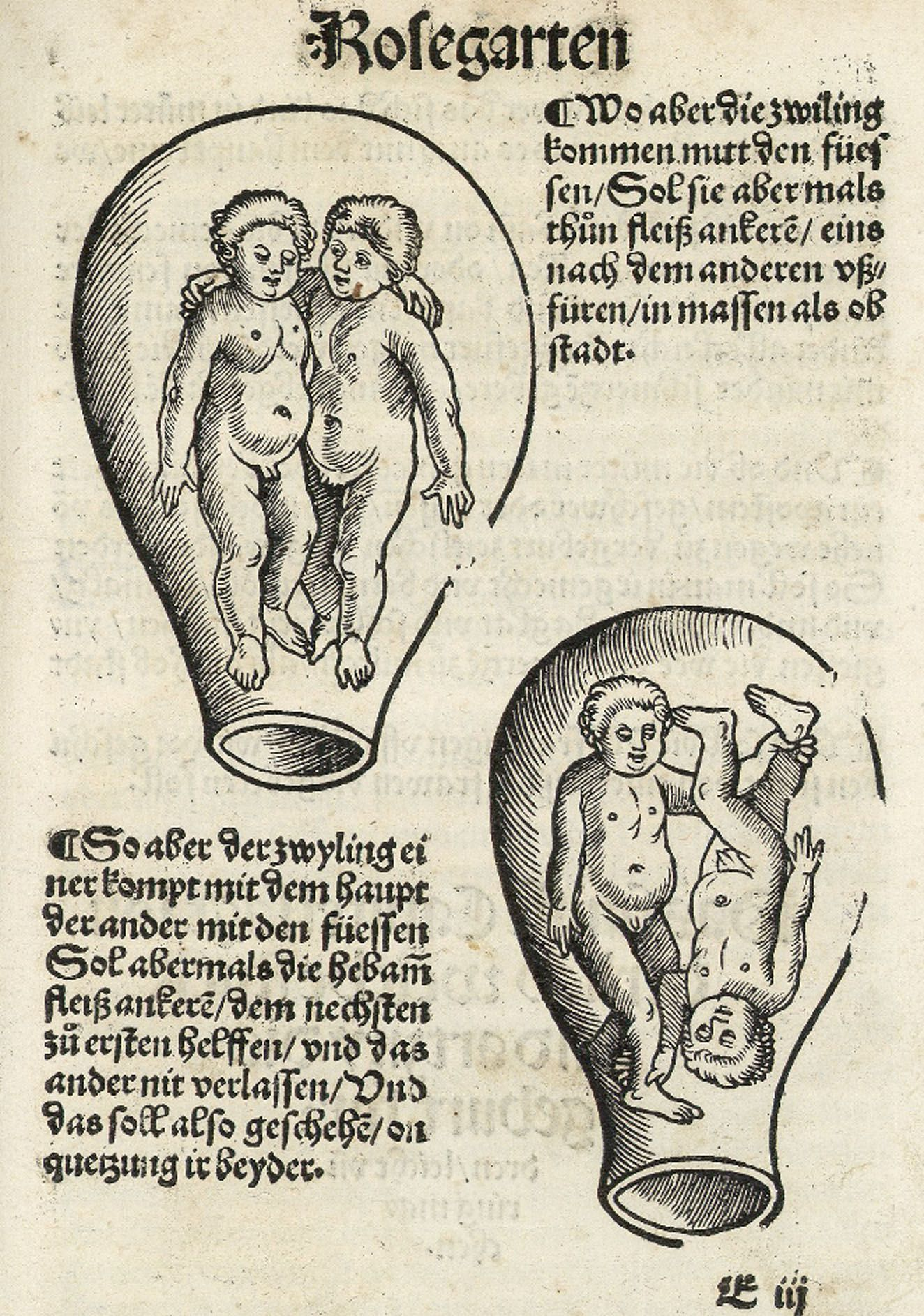
Presentation of twins in Der Rosengarten ("The Rose Garden"), a German standard medical text for midwives published in 1513

In obstetrics, the presentation of a fetus about to be born specifies which anatomical part of the fetus is leading, that is, is closest to the pelvic inlet of the birth canal. According to the leading part, this is identified as a cephalic, breech, or shoulder presentation. A malpresentation is any presentation other than a vertex presentation (with the top of the head first).

== Classification ==
Thus the various presentations are:

- cephalic presentation (head first):
  - vertex (crown)—the most common and associated with the fewest complications
  - sinciput (forehead)
  - brow (eyebrows)
  - face
  - chin
- breech presentation (buttocks or feet first):
  - complete breech
  - footling breech
  - frank breech
- shoulder presentation:
  - arm
  - shoulder
  - trunk
- compound presentation—when any other part presents along with the fetal head

== Related obstetrical terms ==
=== Attitude ===
- Definition: Relationship of fetal head to spine:
  - flexed, (this is the normal situation)
  - neutral ("military"),
  - extended.
  - hyperextended

=== Position ===
- Relationship of presenting part to maternal pelvis based on presentation. The fetus enters the pelvis in the occipito-transverse plane (left or right), descent, and flexion and then rotates 90 degrees to the occipitoanterior (most commonly).
  - Cephalic presentation
    - Vertex presentation with longitudinal lie:
      - Left occipitoanterior (LOA)—the occiput is close to the vagina (hence known as vertex presentation), facing anteriorly (forward with mother standing) and toward the left. This is the most common position and lie.
      - Right occipitoanterior (ROA)—the occiput faces anteriorly and toward the right. Less common than LOA, but not associated with labor complications.
      - Left occipitoposterior (LOP)—the occiput faces posteriorly (behind) and toward the left.
      - Right occipitoposterior (ROP)—the occiput faces posteriorly and toward the right.
      - Occipitoanterior—the occiput faces anteriorly (absolutely straight without any turning to any of the sides)
      - Occipitoposterior—the occiput faces posteriorly (absolutely straight without any turning to any of the sides)
    - Face presentation
      - Mentum anterior—the fetal chin is in the direction of the maternal pubic symphysis.
      - Mentum posterior—the fetal chin is in the direction of the maternal sacrum. This presentation is not compatible with vaginal delivery.
  - Breech presentation with longitudinal lie:
    - Left sacrum anterior (LSA)—the buttocks, as against the occiput of the vertex presentation, lie close to the vagina (hence known as breech presentation), which lie anteriorly and toward the left.
    - Right sacrum anterior (RSA)—the buttocks face anteriorly and toward the right.
    - Left sacrum posterior (LSP)—the buttocks face posteriorly and toward the left.
    - Right sacrum posterior (RSP)—the buttocks face posteriorly and toward the right.
    - Sacrum anterior (SA)—the buttocks face anteriorly.
    - Sacrum posterior (SP)—the buttocks face posteriorly.
  - Shoulder presentations with transverse lie are classified into four types, based on the location of the scapula (shoulder blade). This presentation needs to be delivered by cesarean section.
    - Left scapula-anterior (LSA)
    - Right scapula-anterior (RSA)
    - Left scapula-posterior (LSP)
    - Right scapula-posterior (RSP)

=== Lie ===
- Definition: Relationship between the longitudinal axis of fetus and mother:
  - longitudinal (resulting in either cephalic or breech presentation)
  - oblique (unstable, will eventually become either transverse or longitudinal)
  - transverse (resulting in shoulder presentation)
    - back up
    - back down (indication for vertical uterine incision during cesarean delivery)

== See also ==
- Child birth
- Eucharius Rösslin
- Fetal relations
- Position
