= Caesarean section =

Surgical procedure to deliver a baby

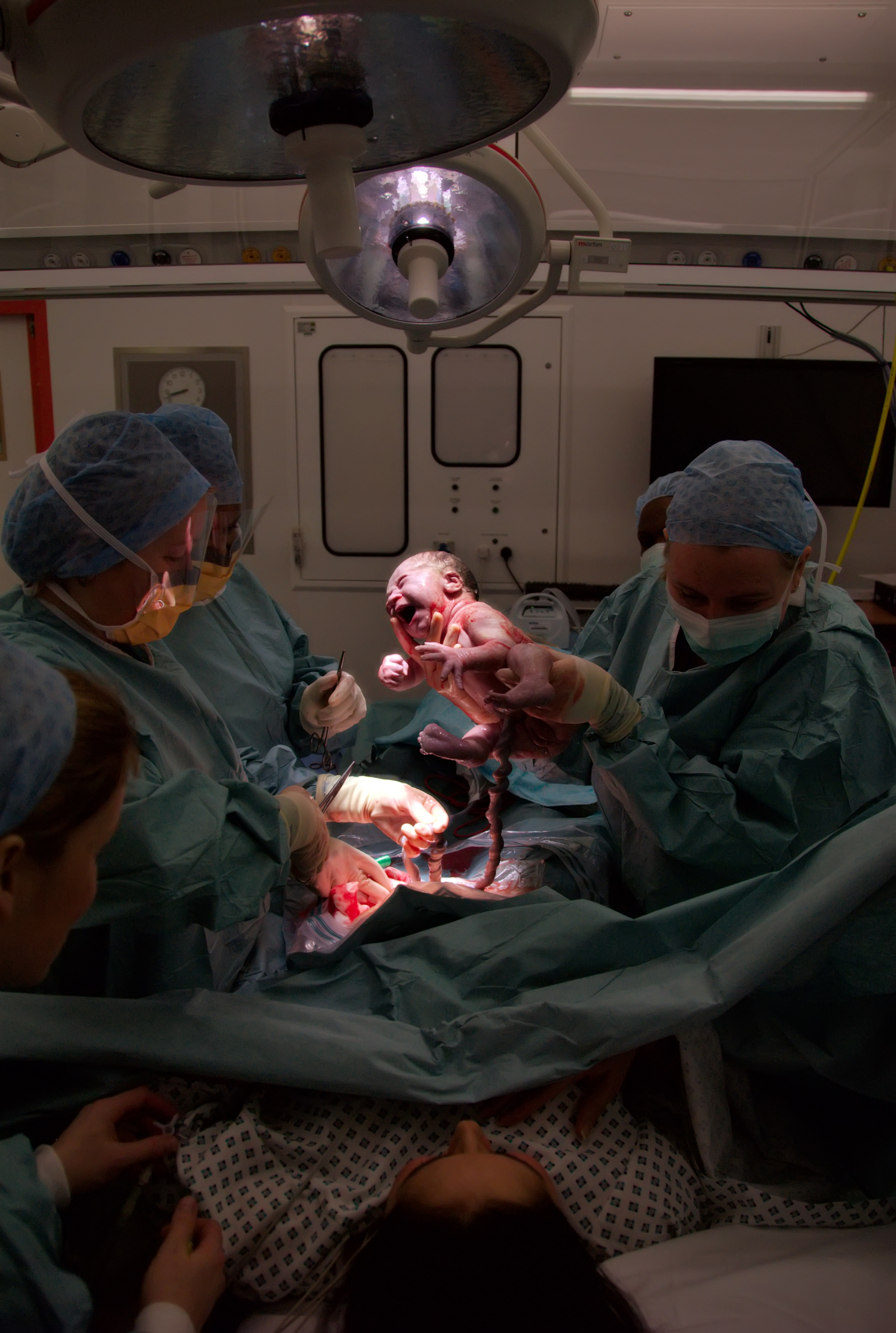
- A team of five performing a caesarean section
- Other names: C-section, caesarean section, caesarean delivery
- Specialty: Obstetrics, gynaecology, surgery, neonatology, pediatrics, family medicine
- ICD-10-PCS: 10D00Z0
- ICD-9-CM: 74
- MeSH: D002585
- MedlinePlus: 002911

Caesarean section, also known as C-section, cesarean, or caesarean delivery, is the surgical procedure by which one or more babies are delivered through an incision in the mother's abdomen. It is often performed because vaginal delivery would put the mother or child at risk of injury or death. Reasons for the operation include, but are not limited to, obstructed labor, twin pregnancy, high blood pressure in the mother, breech birth, shoulder presentation, and problems with the placenta or umbilical cord. A caesarean delivery may be performed based upon the shape of the mother's pelvis or history of a previous C-section. A trial of vaginal birth after C-section may be possible. The World Health Organization recommends that caesarean section be performed only when medically necessary.

A C-section typically takes between 45 minutes to an hour to complete. It may be done with a spinal block, where the woman is awake, or under general anesthesia. A urinary catheter is used to drain the bladder, and the skin of the abdomen is then cleaned with an antiseptic. An incision of about 15 cm (5.9 in) is then typically made through the mother's lower abdomen. The uterus is then opened with a second incision and the baby delivered. The incisions are then stitched closed. A woman can typically begin breastfeeding as soon as she is out of the operating room and awake. Often, several days are required in the hospital to recover sufficiently to return home.

C-sections result in a small overall increase in poor outcomes in low-risk pregnancies. They also typically take about six weeks to heal, longer than vaginal birth. The increased risks include breathing problems in the baby and amniotic fluid embolism and postpartum bleeding in the mother. Established guidelines recommend that caesarean sections not be used before 39 weeks of pregnancy without a medical reason. The method of delivery does not appear to affect subsequent sexual function.

In 2012, about 23 million C-sections were done globally. The international healthcare community has previously considered the rate of 10% and 15% ideal for caesarean sections. Some evidence finds that a higher rate of 19% may result in better outcomes. More than 45 countries globally have C-section rates less than 7.5%, while more than 50 have rates greater than 27%. Efforts are being made to both improve access to and reduce the use of C-section. In the United States as of 2017, about 32% of deliveries are by C-section.

The surgery has been performed at least as far back as 715 BC following the death of the mother, with the baby occasionally surviving. A popular idea is that the Roman statesman Julius Caesar was born via caesarean section and is the namesake of the procedure, but if this is the true etymology, it is probably based on a misconception: until the modern era, C-sections seem to have been invariably fatal to the mother, and Caesar's mother Aurelia not only survived her son's birth but lived for nearly 50 years afterward. There are many ancient and medieval legends, oral histories, and historical records of laws about C-sections around the world, especially in Europe, the Middle East and Asia. The first recorded successful C-section (where both the mother and the infant survived) was allegedly performed on a woman in Switzerland in 1500 by her husband, Jacob Nufer, though this was not recorded until 8 decades later. With the introduction of antiseptics and anesthetics in the 19th century, the survival of both the mother and baby, and thus the procedure, became significantly more common.

== Uses ==
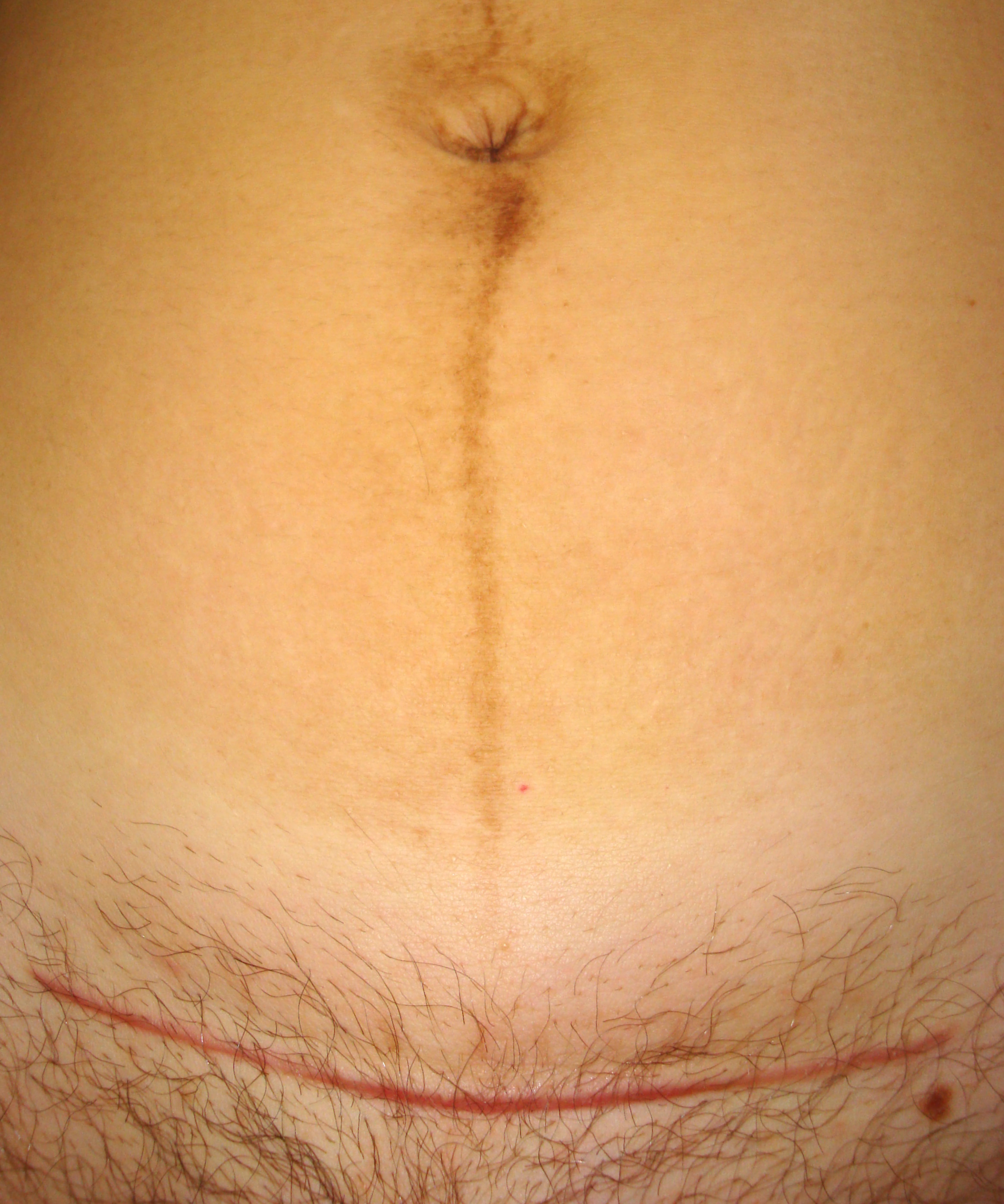
A seven-week-old caesarean section scar (horizontal) and linea nigra (vertical) visible on a 31-year-old mother. Longitudinal (vertical) incisions are still sometimes used.

Caesarean section (C-section) is recommended when vaginal delivery might pose a risk to the mother or baby. C-sections are also carried out for personal and social reasons on maternal request in some countries.

=== Medical uses ===
Complications of labor and factors increasing the risk associated with vaginal delivery include:

- Abnormal presentation (breech or transverse positions)
- Prolonged labor or a failure to progress (obstructed labour, also known as dystocia)
- Fetal distress
- Cord prolapse
- Uterine rupture or an elevated risk thereof
- Uncontrolled hypertension, pre-eclampsia, or eclampsia in the mother
- Tachycardia in the mother or baby after amniotic rupture (the waters breaking)
- Placenta problems (placenta praevia, placental abruption or placenta accreta)
- Failed labor induction
- Failed instrumental delivery (by forceps or ventouse (Sometimes, a trial of forceps/ventouse delivery is attempted, and if unsuccessful, the baby will need to be delivered by caesarean section.))
- Large baby weighing > 4,000 grams (macrosomia)
- Umbilical cord abnormalities (vasa previa, multilobate including bilobate and succenturiate-lobed placentas, velamentous insertion)

Other complications of pregnancy, pre-existing conditions, and concomitant diseases include:

- Previous (high-risk) fetus
- HIV infection of the mother with a high viral load (HIV with a low maternal viral load is not necessarily an indication for caesarean section)
- An outbreak of genital herpes in the third trimester (which can cause infection in the baby if born vaginally)
- Previous classical (longitudinal) caesarean section
- Previous uterine rupture
- Prior problems with the healing of the perineum (from previous childbirth or Crohn's disease)
- Bicornuate uterus
- Rare cases of posthumous birth after the death of the mother

Other

- Decreasing experience of accoucheurs with the management of breech presentation. Although obstetricians and midwives are extensively trained in proper procedures for breech presentation deliveries using simulation mannequins, there is a decrease in experience with actual vaginal breech delivery, which may increase the risk.

=== Prevention ===
The prevalence of caesarean section is generally agreed to be higher than needed in many countries. Physicians are encouraged to actively lower the rate, as a caesarean rate exceeding 10–15% is not associated with reductions in maternal or infant mortality rates, although some evidence supports that a higher rate of 19% may result in better outcomes.

Some of these efforts include emphasizing a long latent phase of labor is not abnormal and not a justification for C-section; a new definition of the start of active labor from a cervical dilatation of 4 cm to a dilatation of 6 cm; and allowing women who have previously given birth to push for at least 2 hours, with 3 hours of pushing for women who have not previously given birth, before labor arrest is considered. Physical exercise during pregnancy decreases the risk. Additionally, results from a 2021 systematic review of the evidence on outpatient cervical ripening found that in women with low-risk pregnancies, the risk of caesarean delivery with harm to the mother or child was not significantly different from when done in an inpatient setting. A 2026 systematic review found that adding doula support to usual maternity care was associated with about four fewer caesarean births per 100 women, with moderate certainty of evidence.

== Risks ==
Adverse outcomes in low-risk pregnancies occur in 8.6% of vaginal deliveries and 9.2% of caesarean section deliveries.

=== Mother ===
In those who are low risk, the risk of death for caesarean sections is 13 per 100,000 versus 3.5 per 100,000 for vaginal birth in the developed world. The United Kingdom National Health Service gives the risk of death for the mother as three times that of a vaginal birth.

In Canada, the difference in serious morbidity or mortality for the mother (e.g., cardiac arrest, wound hematoma, or hysterectomy) was 1.8 additional cases per 100. The difference in in-hospital maternal death was not significant.

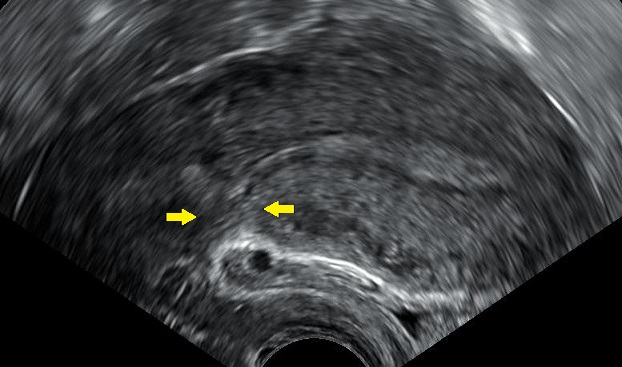
Transvaginal ultrasonography of a uterus years after a caesarean section, showing the characteristic scar formation in its anterior part

A caesarean section is associated with risks of postoperative adhesions, incisional hernias (which may require surgical correction), and wound infections. If a caesarean is performed in an emergency, the risk of the surgery may be increased due to several factors. The patient's stomach may not be empty, increasing the risk of anaesthesia. Other risks include severe blood loss (which may require a blood transfusion) and post-dural-puncture spinal-headaches.

Wound infections occur after caesarean sections at a rate of 3–15%. The presence of chorioamnionitis and obesity predisposes the woman to develop a surgical site infection.

Women who have had caesarean sections are more likely to have problems with later pregnancies, and women who want larger families should not seek an elective caesarean unless medical indications to do so exist. The risk of placenta accreta, a potentially life-threatening condition that is more likely to develop where a woman has had a previous caesarean section, is 0.13% after two caesarean sections, but increases to 2.13% after four and then to 6.74% after six or more. Along with this is a similar rise in the risk of emergency hysterectomies at delivery.

Mothers can experience an increased incidence of postnatal depression. They may experience significant psychological trauma and ongoing birth-related post-traumatic stress disorder after obstetric intervention during the birthing process. Factors like pain in the first stage of labor, feelings of powerlessness, and intrusive emergency obstetric intervention are important in the subsequent development of psychological issues related to labor and delivery.

==== Subsequent pregnancies ====
Women who have had a caesarean for any reason are somewhat less likely to become pregnant again as compared to women who have previously delivered only vaginally.

Women who have had just one previous caesarean section are more likely to have problems with their second birth. Delivery after previous caesarean section is by either of two main options:

- Vaginal birth after caesarean section (VBAC)
- Elective repeat caesarean section (ERCS)

Both have higher risks than a vaginal birth with no previous caesarean section. A vaginal birth after caesarean section (VBAC) confers a higher risk of uterine rupture (5 per 1,000), blood transfusion or endometritis (10 per 1,000), and perinatal death of the child (0.25 per 1,000). Furthermore, 20% to 40% of planned VBAC attempts end in caesarean section being needed, with greater risks of complications in an emergency repeat caesarean section than in an elective repeat caesarean section. On the other hand, VBAC confers less maternal morbidity and a decreased risk of complications in future pregnancies than elective repeat caesarean section.

==== Adhesions ====
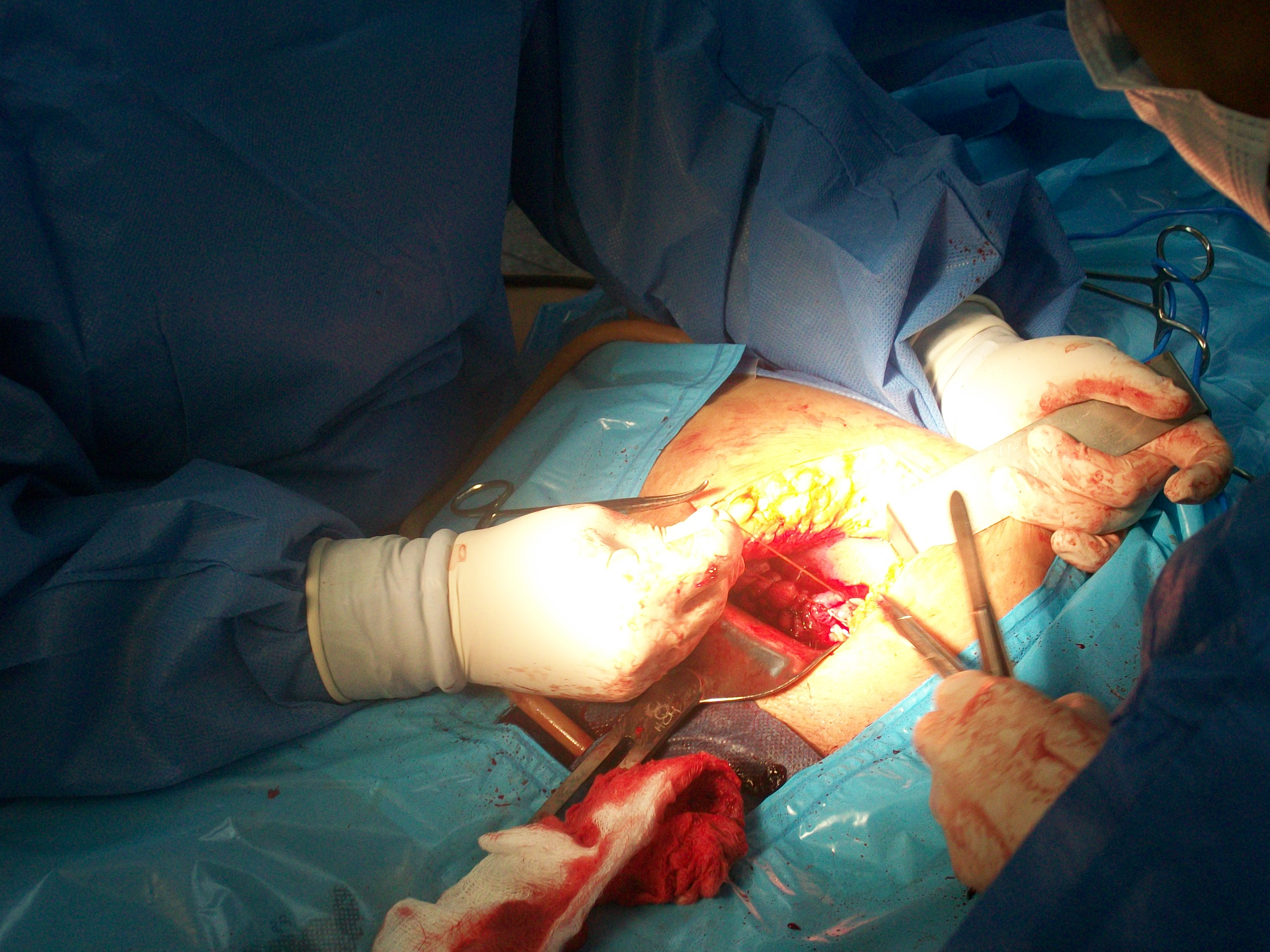
Suturing of the uterus after extraction

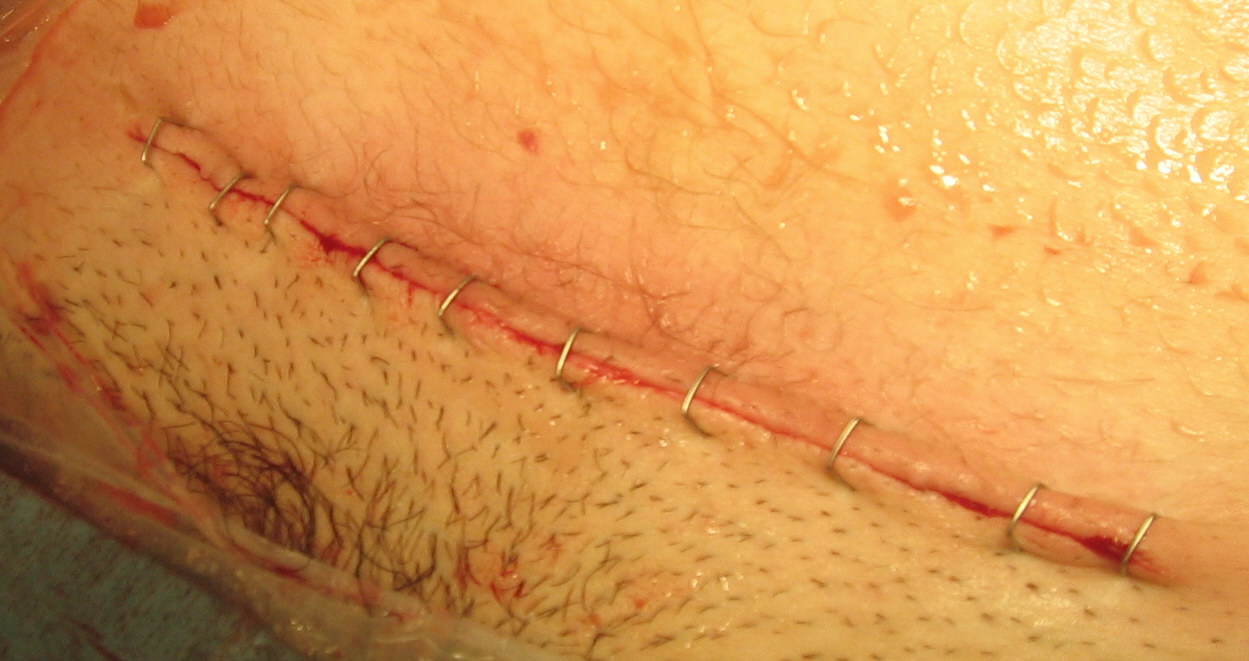
Closed incision for low transverse abdominal incision after stapling has been completed

Several steps can be taken during abdominal or pelvic surgery to minimize postoperative complications, such as the risk of developing adhesions. Such techniques and principles may include:

- Handling all tissue with absolute care
- Using powder-free surgical gloves
- Controlling bleeding
- Choosing sutures and implants carefully
- Keeping tissue moist
- Preventing infection with antibiotics given intravenously to the mother before skin incision

Despite these proactive measures, adhesion formation is a recognized abdominal or pelvic surgery complication. To prevent adhesions from forming after caesarean section, adhesion barrier can be placed during surgery to minimize the risk of adhesions between the uterus and ovaries, the small bowel, and almost any tissue in the abdomen or pelvis. This is not current UK practice, as there is no compelling evidence to support the benefit of this intervention.

Adhesions can cause long-term problems, such as:

- Infertility, which may end when adhesions distort the tissues of the ovaries and tubes, impeding the normal passage of the egg (ovum) from the ovary to the uterus. One in five infertility cases may be adhesion-related (stoval)
- Chronic pelvic pain, which may result when adhesions are present in the pelvis. Almost 50% of chronic pelvic pain cases are estimated to be adhesion-related (stoval)
- Small bowel obstruction: the disruption of normal bowel flow, which can result when adhesions twist or pull the small bowel.

The risk of adhesion formation is one reason why vaginal delivery is usually considered safer than elective caesarean section, where there is no medical indication for section for either maternal or fetal reasons.

=== Child ===
Non-medically indicated (elective) childbirth before 39 weeks gestation "carry significant risks for the baby with no known benefit to the mother." Newborn mortality at 37 weeks may be up to 3 times the number at 40 weeks and is elevated compared to 38 weeks of gestation. These early-term births were associated with more deaths during infancy, compared to those occurring at 39 to 41 weeks (full-term). Researchers in one study and another review found many benefits to going full term, but no adverse effects in the health of the mothers or babies.

The American Congress of Obstetricians and Gynecologists and medical policymakers review research studies and find more incidence of suspected or proven sepsis, RDS, hypoglycemia, need for respiratory support, need for NICU admission, and need for hospitalization greater than 4–5 days. In the case of caesarean sections, rates of respiratory death were 14 times higher in pre-labor at 37 weeks compared with 40 weeks of gestation, and 8.2 times higher for pre-labor caesarean at 38 weeks. In this review, no studies found decreased neonatal morbidity due to non-medically indicated (elective) delivery before 39 weeks.

For otherwise healthy twin pregnancies where both twins are head down a trial of vaginal delivery is recommended at between 37 and 38 weeks. Vaginal delivery, in this case, does not worsen the outcome for either infant as compared with caesarean section. There is some controversy on the best method of delivery where the first twin is head first and the second is not, but most obstetricians will recommend normal delivery unless there are other reasons to avoid vaginal birth. When the first twin is not head down, a caesarean section is often recommended. Regardless of whether the twins are delivered by section or vaginally, the medical literature recommends delivery of dichorionic twins at 37 weeks, and monochorionic twins (identical twins sharing a placenta) by 36 weeks due to the increased risk of stillbirth in monochorionic twins who remain in utero after 37 weeks. The consensus is that late preterm delivery of monochorionic twins is justified because the risk of stillbirth for post-37-week delivery is significantly higher than the risks posed by delivering monochorionic twins near term (i.e., 36–37 weeks). The consensus concerning monoamniotic twins (identical twins sharing an amniotic sac), the highest risk type of twins, is that they should be delivered by caesarean section at or shortly after 32 weeks, since the risks of intrauterine death of one or both twins are higher after this gestation than the risk of complications of prematurity.

In a widely publicized research study, singleton children born earlier than 39 weeks may have developmental problems, including slower learning in reading and math.

Other risks include:

- Wet lung (Transient tachypnea of the newborn): Failure to pass through the birth canal does not expose the baby to cortisol and epinephrine, which typically would reverse the potassium/sodium pumps in the baby's lung. This causes fluid to remain in the lungs.
- Potential for early delivery and complications: Preterm delivery may be inadvertently carried out if the due date calculation is inaccurate. One study found an increased complication risk if a repeat elective caesarean section is performed even a few days before the recommended 39 weeks.
- Higher infant mortality risk: In caesarean sections performed with no indicated medical risk (singleton at full term in a head-down position with no other obstetric or medical complications), the risk of death in the first 28 days of life has been cited as 1.77 per 1,000 live births among women who had caesarean sections, compared to 0.62 per 1,000 for women who delivered vaginally.

Birth by caesarean section also seems to be associated with worse health outcomes later in life, including overweight or obesity, problems in the immune system, and poor digestive system. However, caesarean deliveries are found not to affect a newborn's risk of developing food allergies. This finding contradicts a previous study that claims babies born via caesarean section have lower levels of Bacteroides that is linked to peanut allergy in infants.

== Classification ==
Caesarean sections have been classified in various ways by different perspectives. One way to discuss all classification systems is to group them by their focus, either on the urgency of the procedure (most common), characteristics of the mother, or as a group based on other, less commonly discussed factors.

=== By urgency ===
Conventionally, caesarean sections are classified as either an elective surgery or an emergency operation. Classification is used to help communication between the obstetric, midwifery and anaesthetic team for discussion of the most appropriate method of anaesthesia. The decision whether to perform general anesthesia or regional anesthesia (spinal or epidural anaesthetic) is important. It is based on many indications, including the urgency of the delivery and the woman's medical and obstetric history. Regional anaesthesia is almost always safer for the woman and the baby. Sometimes, a general anaesthetic is safer for one or both, and the urgency of the delivery is an important issue affecting this decision.

A planned caesarean (or elective/scheduled caesarean), arranged ahead of time, is most commonly arranged for medical indications that have developed before or during the pregnancy, and ideally after 39 weeks of gestation. In the UK, this is classified as a 'grade 4' section (delivery timed to suit the mother or hospital staff) or as a 'grade 3' section (no maternal or fetal compromise but early delivery needed). Emergency caesarean sections are performed in pregnancies in which a vaginal delivery was planned initially, but an indication for caesarean delivery has since developed. In the UK they are further classified as grade 2 (delivery required within 90 minutes of the decision but no immediate threat to the life of the woman or the fetus) or grade 1 (delivery required within 30 minutes of the decision: immediate threat to the life of the mother or the baby or both.)

Elective caesarean sections may be performed based on an obstetrical or medical indication, or because of a medically non-indicated maternal request. Among women in the United Kingdom, Sweden, and Australia, about 7% preferred caesarean section as a method of delivery. In cases without medical indications, the American Congress of Obstetricians and Gynecologists and the UK Royal College of Obstetricians and Gynaecologists recommend a planned vaginal delivery. The National Institute for Health and Care Excellence recommends that if, after a woman has been provided information on the risk of a planned caesarean section, and she still insists on the procedure, it should be provided. If provided, this should be done at 39 weeks of gestation or later. There is no evidence that ECS can reduce mother-to-child hepatitis B and hepatitis C virus transmission.

=== By characteristics of the mother ===
==== Caesarean delivery on maternal request ====
Caesarean delivery on maternal request (CDMR) is a medically unnecessary caesarean section, where the conduct of a childbirth via a caesarean section is requested by the pregnant patient even though there is not a medical indication to have the surgery. Systematic reviews have found no strong evidence about the impact of caesareans for nonmedical reasons. Recommendations encourage counseling to identify the reasons for the request, addressing anxieties and information, and encouraging vaginal birth. Elective caesareans at 38 weeks in some studies showed increased health complications in the newborn. For this reason, ACOG and NICE recommend that elective caesarean sections should not be scheduled before 39 weeks of gestation unless there is a medical reason. Planned caesarean sections may be scheduled earlier if there is a medical reason.

==== After previous caesarean ====
Mothers who have previously had a caesarean section are more likely to have a caesarean section for future pregnancies than mothers who have never had a caesarean section. There is a discussion about the circumstances under which women should have a vaginal birth after a previous caesarean.

Vaginal birth after caesarean (VBAC) is the practice of birthing a baby vaginally after a previous baby has been delivered by caesarean section (surgically). According to the American College of Obstetricians and Gynecologists (ACOG), successful VBAC is associated with decreased maternal morbidity and a decreased risk of complications in future pregnancies. According to the American Pregnancy Association, 90% of women who have undergone caesarean deliveries are candidates for VBAC. Approximately 60–80% of women opting for VBAC will successfully give birth vaginally, which is comparable to the overall vaginal delivery rate in the United States in 2010.

==== Twins ====
For otherwise healthy twin pregnancies where both twins are head down, a trial of vaginal delivery is recommended between 37 and 38 weeks. Vaginal delivery in this case does not worsen the outcome for either infant as compared with caesarean section. There is controversy on the best method of delivery where the first twin is head first and the second is not. When the first twin is not head down at the point of labor starting, a caesarean section should be recommended. Although the second twin typically has a higher frequency of problems, it is unknown if a planned caesarean section affects this. It is estimated that 75% of twin pregnancies in the United States were delivered by caesarean section in 2008.

==== Breech birth ====
A breech birth is the birth of a baby from a breech presentation, in which the baby exits the pelvis with the buttocks or feet first as opposed to the normal head-first presentation. In breech presentation, fetal heart sounds are heard just above the umbilicus.

Babies are usually born headfirst. If the baby is in another position, the birth may be complicated. In a 'breech presentation', the unborn baby is bottom-down instead of head-down. Babies born bottom-first are more likely to be harmed during a normal (vaginal) birth than those born head-first. For instance, the baby might not get enough oxygen during the birth. Having a planned caesarean may reduce these problems. A review looking at planned caesarean section for singleton breech presentation with planned vaginal birth, concludes that in the short term, births with a planned caesarean were safer for babies than vaginal births. Fewer babies died or were seriously hurt when they were born by caesarean. There was tentative evidence that children who were born by caesarean had more health problems at age two. Caesareans caused some short-term problems for mothers, such as more abdominal pain. They also had some benefits, e.g., less urinary incontinence and perineal pain.

The bottom-down position presents some hazards to the baby during the process of birth, and the mode of delivery (vaginal versus caesarean) is controversial in the fields of obstetrics and midwifery.

Though vaginal birth is possible for the breech baby, certain fetal and maternal factors influence the safety of vaginal breech birth. The majority of breech babies born in the United States and the UK are delivered by caesarean section, as studies have shown increased risks of morbidity and mortality for vaginal breech delivery, and most obstetricians counsel against planned vaginal breech birth for this reason. As a result of reduced numbers of actual vaginal breech deliveries, obstetricians and midwives are at risk of de-skilling in this important skill. All those involved in the delivery of obstetric and midwifery care in the UK undergo mandatory training in conducting breech deliveries in the simulation environment (using dummy pelvises and mannequins to allow the practice of this important skill), and this training is carried out regularly to keep skills up to date.

==== Resuscitative hysterotomy ====
A resuscitative hysterotomy, also known as a peri-mortem caesarean delivery, is an emergency caesarean delivery carried out where maternal cardiac arrest has occurred, to assist in resuscitation of the mother by removing the aortocaval compression generated by the gravid uterus. Unlike other forms of caesarean section, the welfare of the fetus is a secondary priority only, and the procedure may be performed even before the limit of fetal viability if it is judged to be of benefit to the mother.

=== Other ways, including the surgery technique ===
There are several types of caesarean section (CS). An important distinction lies in the type of incision (longitudinal or transverse) made on the uterus, apart from the incision on the skin: the vast majority of skin incisions are a transverse suprapubic approach known as a Pfannenstiel incision, but there is no way of knowing from the skin scar which way the uterine incision was conducted.

- The classical caesarean section involves a longitudinal midline incision on the uterus, which allows a larger space to deliver the baby. It is performed at very early gestations, where the lower segment of the uterus is unformed, as it is safer in this situation for the baby. It is rarely performed other than at these early gestations, as the operation is more prone to complications than a low transverse uterine incision. Any woman who has had a classical section will be recommended to have an elective repeat section in subsequent pregnancies, as the vertical incision is much more likely to rupture in labor than the transverse incision.
- The lower uterine segment section is the procedure most commonly used today; it involves a transverse cut just above the edge of the bladder. It results in less blood loss and has fewer early and late complications for the mother, as well as allowing her to consider a vaginal birth in the next pregnancy.
- A caesarean hysterectomy consists of a caesarean section followed by the removal of the uterus. This may be done in cases of intractable bleeding or when the placenta cannot be separated from the uterus.

The EXIT procedure is a specialized surgical delivery procedure used to deliver babies who have airway compression.

The Misgav Ladach method is a modified caesarean section that has been used globally since the 1990s. It was described by Michael Stark, the president of the New European Surgical Academy, at the time he was the director of Misgav Ladach, a general hospital in Jerusalem. The method was presented during a FIGO conference in Montréal in 1994 and then distributed by the University of Uppsala, Sweden, in more than 100 countries. This method is based on minimalistic principles. He examined all steps in caesarean sections in use, analyzed them for their necessity, and, if found necessary, for their optimal performance. For the abdominal incision, he used the modified Joel Cohen incision and compared the longitudinal abdominal structures to strings on musical instruments. As blood vessels and muscles have lateral sway, it is possible to stretch rather than cut them. The peritoneum is opened by repeated stretching; no abdominal swabs are used, the uterus is closed in one layer with a big needle to reduce the amount of foreign body as much as possible, the peritoneal layers remain unsutured, and the abdomen is closed with two layers only. Women undergoing this operation recover quickly and can look after the newborns soon after surgery. Many publications are showing the advantages over traditional caesarean section methods. There is also an increased risk of abruptio placentae and uterine rupture in subsequent pregnancies for women who underwent this method in prior deliveries.

Since 2015, the World Health Organization has endorsed the Robson classification as a holistic means of comparing childbirth rates between different settings, to allow more accurate comparison of caesarean section rates.

== Technique ==
Several caesarean sections Is: supra-umbilical incision Im: median incision IM: Maylard incision IP: Pfannenstiel incision

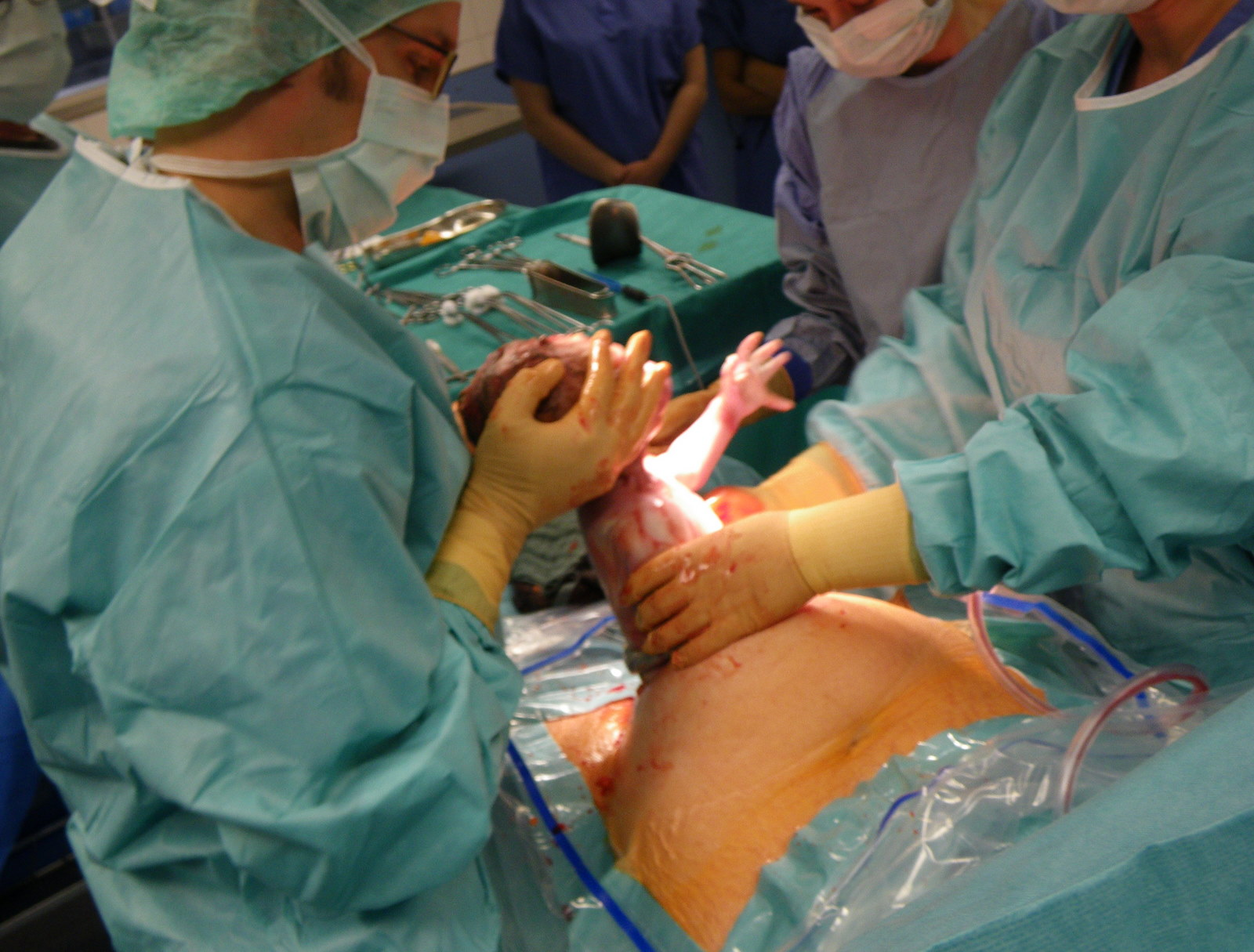
Removal of the baby

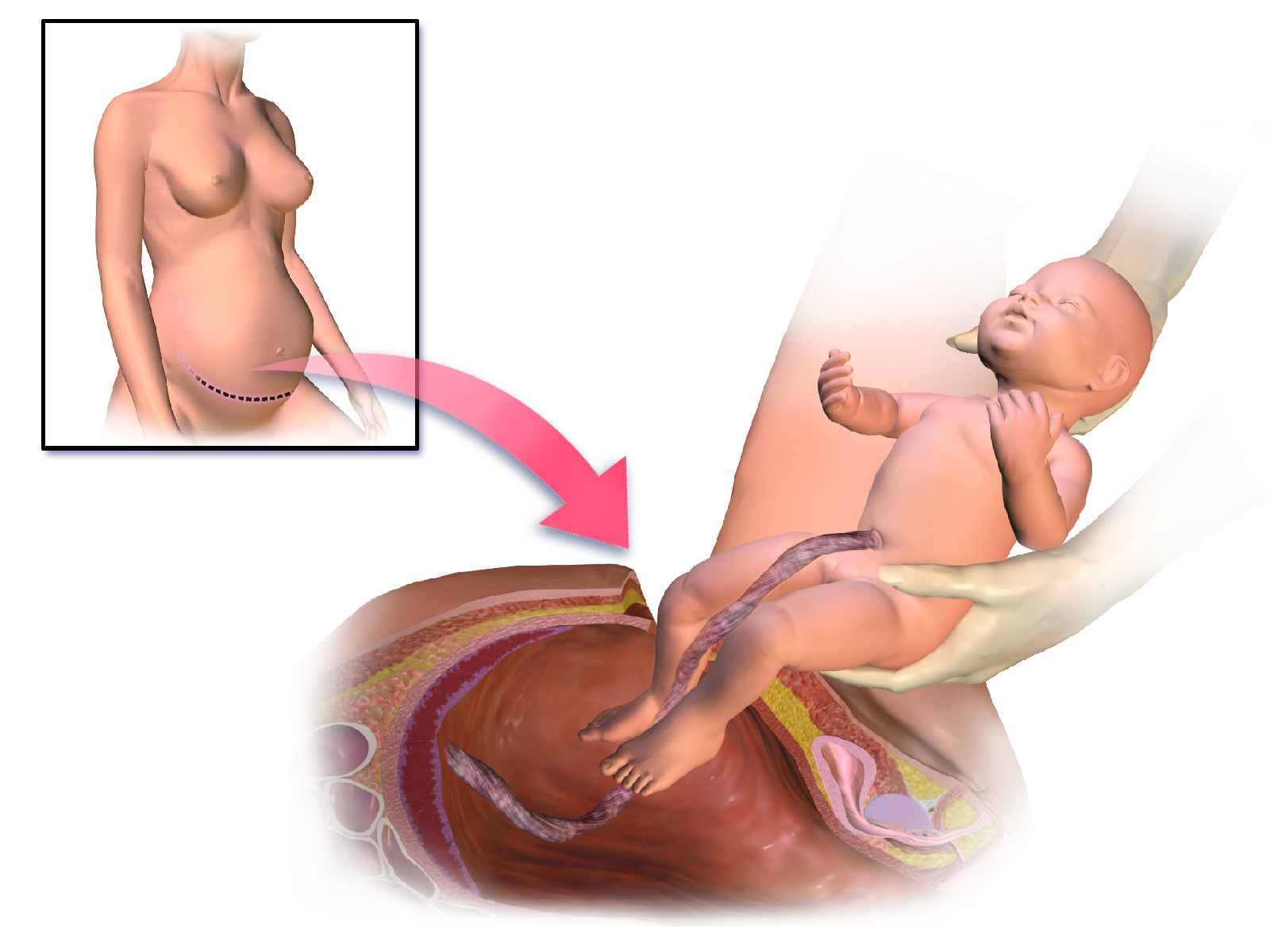
Illustration depicting caesarean section

Antibiotic prophylaxis is used before an incision. The uterus is incised, and this incision is extended with blunt pressure along a cephalad-caudad axis. The infant is delivered, and the placenta is then removed. The surgeon then decides about uterine exteriorization. Single-layer uterine closure is used when the mother does not want a future pregnancy. When subcutaneous tissue is 2 cm thick or more, surgical suture is used. Discouraged practices include manual cervical dilation, any subcutaneous drain, or supplemental oxygen therapy with intent to prevent infection.

Caesarean section can be performed with single or double layer suturing of the uterine incision. Single layer closure compared with double layer closure has been observed to result in reduced blood loss during the surgery. It is uncertain whether this is the direct effect of the suturing technique or if other factors, such as the type and site of abdominal incision, contribute to reduced blood loss. Standard procedure includes the closure of the peritoneum. Research questions whether this is needed, with some studies indicating that peritoneal closure is associated with longer operative time and hospital stay. The Misgav Ladach method is a surgical technique that may have fewer secondary complications and faster healing, due to the insertion into the muscle.

=== Anesthesia ===
Both general and regional anaesthesia (spinal, epidural or combined spinal and epidural anaesthesia) are acceptable for use during caesarean section. Evidence does not show a difference between regional anaesthesia and general anaesthesia concerning major outcomes in the mother or baby. Regional anaesthesia may be preferred as it allows the mother to be awake and interact immediately with her baby. Compared to general anaesthesia, regional anaesthesia is better at preventing persistent postoperative pain 3 to 8 months after caesarean section. Other advantages of regional anesthesia may include the absence of typical risks of general anesthesia: pulmonary aspiration (which has a relatively high incidence in patients undergoing anesthesia in late pregnancy) of gastric contents and esophageal intubation. One trial found no difference in satisfaction when general anaesthesia was compared with either spinal anaesthesia.

Regional anaesthesia is used in 95% of deliveries, with spinal and combined spinal and epidural anaesthesia being the most commonly used regional techniques in scheduled caesarean section. Regional anaesthesia during caesarean section is different from the analgesia (pain relief) used in labor and vaginal delivery. The pain that is experienced because of surgery is greater than that of labor and therefore requires a more intense nerve block.

General anesthesia may be necessary because of specific risks to the mother or child. Patients with heavy, uncontrolled bleeding may not tolerate the hemodynamic effects of regional anesthesia. General anesthesia is also preferred in very urgent cases, such as severe fetal distress when there is no time to perform a regional anesthesia.

=== Prevention of complications ===
Postpartum infection is one of the main causes of maternal death and may account for 10% of maternal deaths globally. A caesarean section greatly increases the risk of infection and associated morbidity, estimated to be between 5 and 20 times as high, and routine use of antibiotic prophylaxis to prevent infections was found by a meta-analysis to reduce the incidence of febrile morbidity substantially. Infection can occur in around 8% of women who have caesareans, largely endometritis, urinary tract infections and wound infections. Preventative antibiotics in women undergoing caesarean section decreased wound infection, endometritis, and serious infectious complications by about 65%. Side effects and effects on the baby are unclear.

Women who have caesareans can recognize the signs of fever that indicate the possibility of wound infection. Taking antibiotics before skin incision rather than after cord clamping reduces the risk for the mother, without increasing adverse effects for the baby. Moderate certainty evidence suggests that chlorhexidine gluconate as a skin preparation is slightly more effective in the prevention of surgical site infections than povidone-iodine, but further research is needed.

Some doctors believe that during a caesarean section, mechanical cervical dilation with a finger or forceps will prevent the obstruction of blood and lochia drainage, and thereby benefit the mother by reducing the risk of death. The evidence as of 2018 neither supported nor refuted this practice for reducing postoperative morbidity, pending further large studies.

Hypotension (low blood pressure) is common in women who have spinal anaesthesia; intravenous fluids such as crystalloids, or leg compression with bandages, stockings, or inflatable devices may help to reduce the risk of hypotension. The evidence is still uncertain about their effectiveness.

=== Skin-to-skin contact ===
The WHO and UNICEF recommend that infants born by Caesarean section should have skin-to-skin contact (SSC) as soon as the mother is alert and responsive. Immediate SSC following a spinal or epidural anaesthetic is possible because the mother remains alert; however, after a general anaesthetic, the father or other family member may provide SSC until the mother is able.

It is known that during the hours of labor before a vaginal birth, a woman's body begins to produce oxytocin, which aids in the bonding process, and it is thought that SSC can trigger its production as well. Indeed, women have reported that they felt that SSC had helped them to feel close to and bond with their infant. A review of literature also found that immediate or early SSC increased the likelihood of successful breastfeeding and that newborns were found to cry less and relax quicker when they had SSC with their father as well.

== Recovery ==
It is common for women who undergo caesarean section to have reduced or absent bowel movements for hours to days. During this time, women may experience abdominal cramps, nausea, and vomiting. This usually resolves without treatment. Poorly controlled pain following non-emergency caesarean section occurs in between 13% and 78% of women. Following caesarean delivery, complementary and alternative therapies (e.g., acupuncture) may help to relieve pain, though evidence supporting the efficacy of such treatments is extremely limited. Abdominal, wound, and back pain can continue for months after a caesarean section. Non-steroidal anti-inflammatory drugs can be helpful. For the first couple of weeks after a caesarean, women should avoid lifting anything heavier than their baby. To minimize pain during breastfeeding, women should experiment with different breastfeeding holds, including the football hold and side-lying hold. Women who have had a caesarean are more likely to experience pain that interferes with their usual activities than women who have vaginal births, although by six months, there is generally no longer a difference. Pain during sexual intercourse is less likely than after vaginal birth; by six months there is no difference.

There may be a somewhat higher incidence of postnatal depression in the first weeks after childbirth for women who have caesarean sections, but this difference does not persist. Some women who have had caesarean sections, especially emergency caesareans, experience post-traumatic stress disorder.

A woman who undergoes caesarean section has 18.3% chance of chronic surgical pain at three months and 6.8% chance of surgical pain at 12 months.

In recent meta-analyses, caesarean section has been associated with a lower risk of urinary incontinence and pelvic organ prolapse compared to vaginal delivery. Women who have vaginal births, after a previous caesarean, are more than twice as likely to subsequently have pelvic floor surgery as those who have another caesarean.

== Frequency ==
Global rates of caesarean section are increasing. It doubled from 2003 to 2018 to reach 21%, and is increasing annually by 4%. The trend toward increasing rates is particularly strong in middle and high-income countries. In southern Africa, the cesarean rate is less than 5%; while the rate is almost 60% in some parts of Latin America. The Canadian rate was 26% in 2005–2006. Australia has a high caesarean section rate, at 31% in 2007. At one time, a rate of 10% to 15% was thought to be ideal; a rate of 19% may result in better outcomes. The World Health Organization officially withdrew its previous recommendation of a 15% C-section rate in June 2010. Their official statement read, "There is no empirical evidence for an optimum percentage. What matters most is that all women who need caesarean sections receive them."

More than 50 nations have rates greater than 27%. Another 45 countries have rates of less than 7.5%. There are efforts to both improve access to and reduce the use of C-sections. Globally, 1% of all caesarean deliveries are carried out without medical need. Overall, the caesarean section rate was 25.7% for 2004–2008.

There is no significant difference in caesarean rates when comparing midwife continuity care to conventional fragmented care. More emergency caesareans—about 66%—are performed during the day rather than the night.

The rate has risen to 46% in China and to levels of 25% and above in many Asian, European and Latin American countries. In Brazil and Iran the caesarean section rate is greater than 40%. Brazil has one of the highest caesarean section rates in the world, with rates in the public sector of 35–45%, and 80–90% in the private sector.

=== Europe ===
Across Europe, there are differences between countries: in Italy, the caesarean section rate is 40%, while in the Nordic countries it is 14%. In the United Kingdom, in 2008, the rate was 24%. By 2025, the UK rate had risen to 45%. In Ireland the rate was 26.1% in 2009.

In Italy, the incidence of caesarean sections is particularly high; it varies from region to region. In Campania, 60% of 2008 births reportedly occurred via caesarean sections. In the Rome region, the mean incidence is around 44%, but can reach as high as 85% in some private clinics.

=== United States ===
In the United States, cesarean deliveries began rising in the 1960s and started becoming routine in the 1960s and 1970s.

In the United States, the rate of C-sections is around 33%, varying from 23% to 40% depending on the state. One of three women who gave birth in the US delivered by caesarean in 2011. In 2012, close to 23 million C-sections were carried out globally.

With nearly 1.3 million stays, caesarean section was one of the most common procedures performed in U.S. hospitals in 2011. It was the second-most common procedure performed for people aged 18 to 44 years old. Caesarean rates in the U.S. have risen considerably since 1996. The rate has increased in the United States, to 33% of all births in 2012, up from 21% in 1996. In 2010, the caesarean delivery rate was 32.8% of all births (a slight decrease from 2009's high of 32.9% of all births). A study found that in 2011, women covered by private insurance were 11% more likely to have a caesarean section delivery than those covered by Medicaid. The increase in use has not resulted in improved outcomes, resulting in the position that C-sections may be done too frequently. It is believed that the high rate of induced deliveries has also led to the high rate of c-sections because they are twice as likely to lead to one.

Hospitals and doctors make more money from C-section births than vaginal deliveries. Economists have calculated that hospitals may make a few thousand dollars more, and doctors a few hundred. It has been found that for-profit hospitals do more C-sections than non-profit hospitals. One study looked at the rate of c-sections done for women who were themselves doctors. It found that there was a 10 percent decrease in the rate of c-sections vs the general population. But if the hospital paid their doctors a flat salary, removing the incentive to do the surgical procedures, which take more time, the rate of c-sections done on women who were themselves physicians exceeded that of the procedure done on non-medically knowledgeable mothers, suggesting that some women who needed c-sections were not getting them.

Concerned about the rising number of cesarean deliveries and hospital costs, in 2009, Minnesota introduced a blended payment rate for vaginal or caesarean uncomplicated births (i.e., a similar payment regardless of delivery mode). As a result, the prepolicy cesarean rate of 22.8% dropped by 3.24 percentage points. The cost of childbirth hospitalizations in Minnesota dropped by $425.80 at the time the policy was initiated and continued to drop by $95.04 per quarter with no significant effects on maternal morbidity.

The rise of caesarean births in the United States has coincided with counter-movements emphasizing natural childbirth with a lesser degree of medical intervention.

=== China ===
The rate of caesarean sections began to increase sharply in China in the 1990s. This increase was driven by the expansion of China's modern hospital infrastructure, and occurred first in urban areas. The rise in cesarean deliveries has also resulted in social critique of the medical establishment over the medical necessity of performing cesarean sections.

== History ==
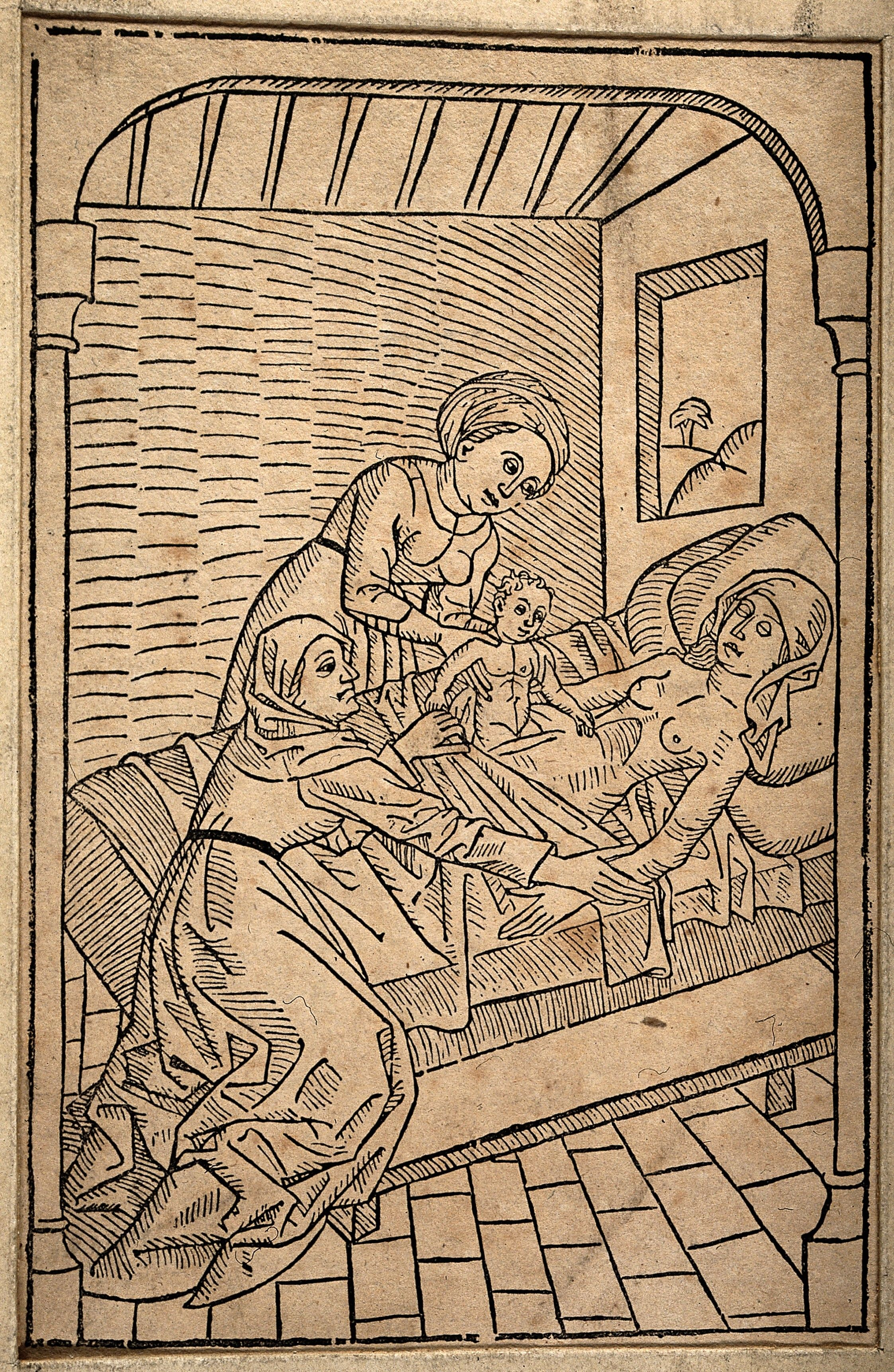
A baby being removed from its dying mother's womb

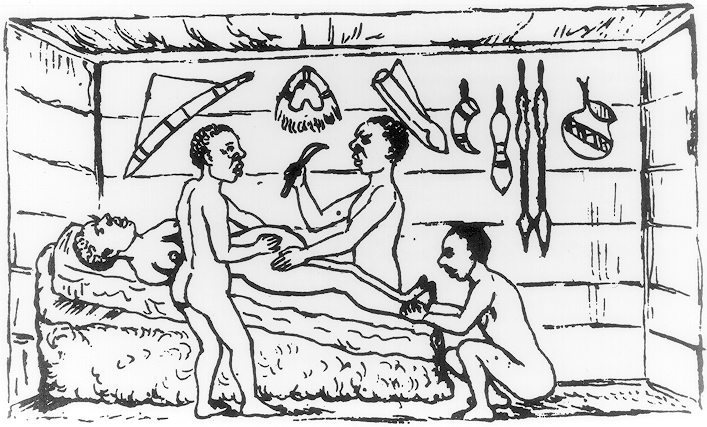
A caesarean section performed by surgeons in Bunyoro, Uganda. As observed by medical missionary Robert William Felkin in 1879.

There are many conflicting stories of the first successful caesarean section in which both mother and baby survived. It is, however, known that the procedure had been attempted for hundreds of years before it became accepted at the beginning of the 20th century. Historically, caesarean sections performed upon a live woman usually resulted in the death of the mother. It was considered an extreme measure, performed only when the mother was already dead or considered to be beyond help. By way of comparison, see the resuscitative hysterotomy or perimortem caesarean section.

According to the ancient Chinese Records of the Grand Historian, Luzhong (陸終), a sixth-generation descendant of the mythical Yellow Emperor, had six sons, all born by "cutting open the body". The sixth son Jilian founded the House of Mi that ruled the State of Chu (c. 1030–223 BC).

The Sanskrit medical treatise Sushruta Samhita, composed in the early 1st millennium AD, mentions post-mortem caesarean sections. The first available non-mythical record of a C-section is that of the mother of Bindusara (born c. 320 BC, ruled 298 – c. 272 BC), the second Mauryan Samrat (emperor) of India, who accidentally consumed poison and died when she was close to delivering him. Chanakya, Chandragupta's teacher and adviser, made up his mind that the baby should survive. He cut open the belly of the queen and took out the baby, thus saving the baby's life.

An early account of caesarean section in Iran (Persia) is mentioned in the book of Shahnameh, written around 1000 AD, and relates to the birth of Rostam, the legendary hero of that country. According to the Shahnameh, the Simurgh instructed Zal upon how to perform a caesarean section, thus saving Rudaba and the child Rostam. In Persian literature, caesarean section is known as Rostamina (رستمینه).

In the Irish mythological text the Ulster Cycle, the character Furbaide Ferbend is said to have been born by posthumous caesarean section, after his mother was murdered by his evil aunt Medb.

The Babylonian Talmud, an ancient Jewish religious text, mentions a procedure similar to the caesarean section. The procedure is termed yotzei dofen. It also discusses at length the permissibility of performing a C-section on a dying or dead mother. Rabbinical reports from the 2nd century AD about discussions that took place even earlier suggested that Jewish women regularly survived the operation in Roman times, but this conflicts with the general view that caesarean sections were always fatal to the mother in the pre-modern era.

Pliny the Elder theorized that Julius Caesar's (born 100 BC) name came from an ancestor who was born by caesarean section. The truth of this is debated. Some popular misconceptions involve Caesar himself being born from the procedure, which is considered false because the procedure was lethal to mothers in ancient Rome, and Caesar's mother Aurelia Cotta lived until he was an adult. The Ancient Roman caesarean section was first performed to remove a baby from the womb of a mother who died during childbirth, a practice sometimes called the Caesarean law.

The Spanish saint Raymond Nonnatus (1204–1240) received his surname—from the Latin non-natus ('not born')—because he was born by caesarean section. His mother died while giving birth to him.

There is some indirect evidence that the first caesarean section in which both the mother and child survived was performed in Prague in 1337. The mother was Beatrice of Bourbon, the second wife of the King of Bohemia John of Luxembourg. Beatrice gave birth to the king's son Wenceslaus I, later the Duke of Luxembourg, Brabant, and Limburg, and who became the half brother of the later King of Bohemia and Holy Roman Emperor, Charles IV.

In an account from the 1580s, Jacob Nufer, a veterinarian in Siegershausen, Switzerland, is supposed to have operated on his wife after a prolonged labour, with her surviving. His wife allegedly bore five more children, including twins, and the baby delivered by caesarean section purportedly lived to the age of 77.

For most of the time since the 16th century, the procedure had a high mortality rate by modern standards. Key steps in reducing mortality were:

- Introduction of the transverse incision technique to minimize bleeding by Ferdinand Adolf Kehrer in 1881 is thought to be the first modern CS performed.
- The introduction of uterine suturing by Max Sänger in 1882
- Modification by Hermann Johannes Pfannenstiel in 1900, see Pfannenstiel incision
- Extraperitoneal CS and then moving to low transverse incision (Krönig, 1912)
- Adherence to principles of asepsis
- Anesthesia advances
- Blood transfusion
- Antibiotics

Indigenous people in the Great Lakes region of Africa, including Rwanda and Uganda, performed caesarean sections, which in one account by Robert William Felkin from 1879 resulted in the survival of both mother and child. Banana wine was used, although the site of the incision was then also washed with water and, post-operation, covered with a paste made by chewing two different roots. From the well-developed nature of the medical procedures employed, he concluded that these procedures had been used for some time. James Barry was the first European doctor to carry out a successful caesarean in Africa, while posted to Cape Town between 1817 and 1828.

The first successful caesarean section to be performed in the United States took place in Rockingham County, Virginia, in 1794. The procedure was performed by Dr. Jesse Bennett on his wife Elizabeth.

=== Caesarius of Terracina ===
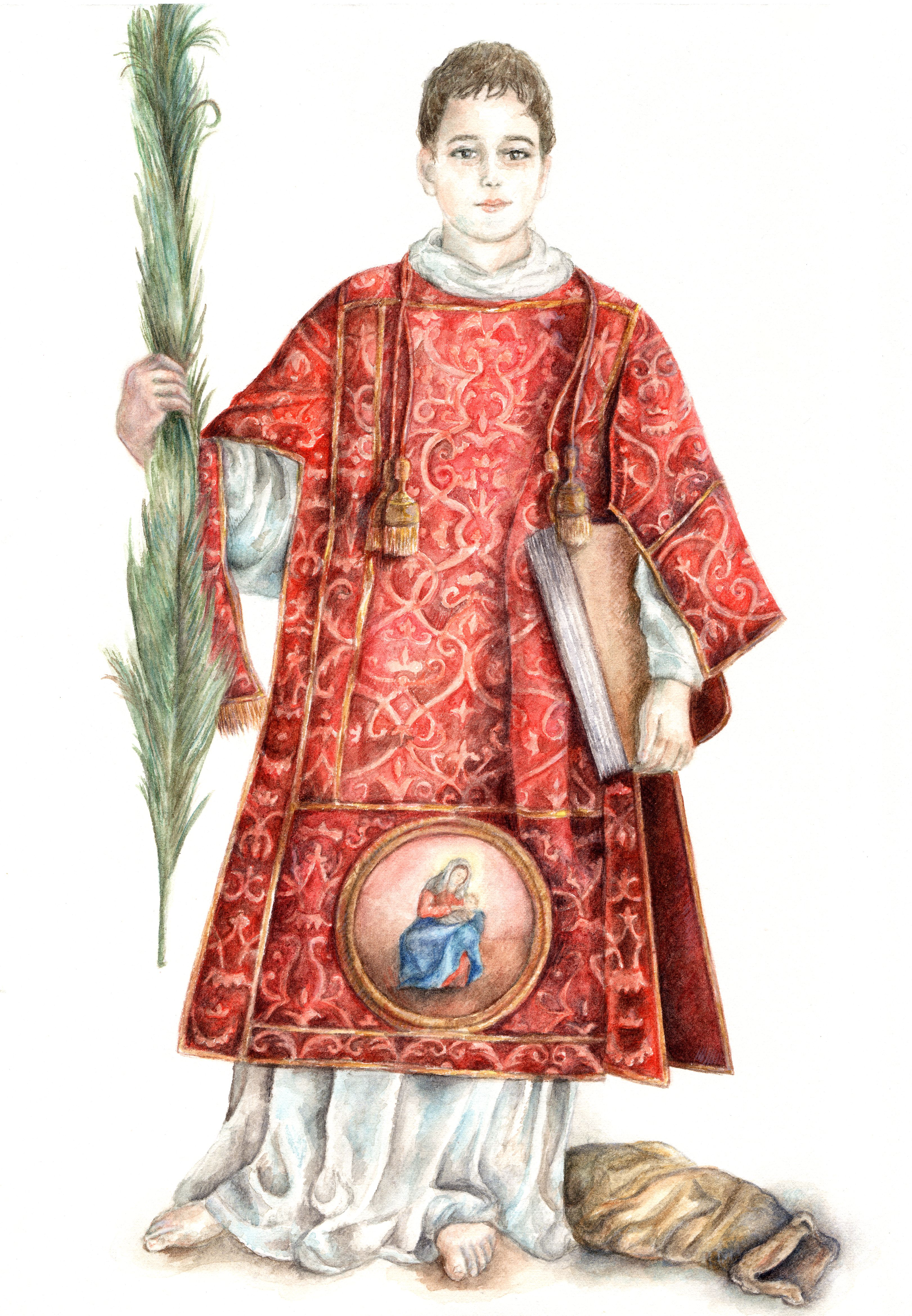
Saint Caesarius of Terracina, invoked for the success of caesarean delivery

The patron saint of caesarean section is Caesarius, a young deacon martyred at Terracina, who has replaced and Christianized the pagan figure of Caesar. The martyr (Saint Cesareo in Italian) is invoked for the success of this surgical procedure, because it was considered the new "Christian Caesar" – as opposed to the "pagan Caesar" – in the Middle Ages it began to be invoked by pregnant women to wish a physiological birth, for the success of the expulsion of the baby from the uterus and, therefore, for their salvation and that of the unborn. The practice continues; in fact, the martyr Caesarius is invoked by the future mothers who, due to health problems or those of the baby, must give birth to their child by caesarean section.

== Etymology ==
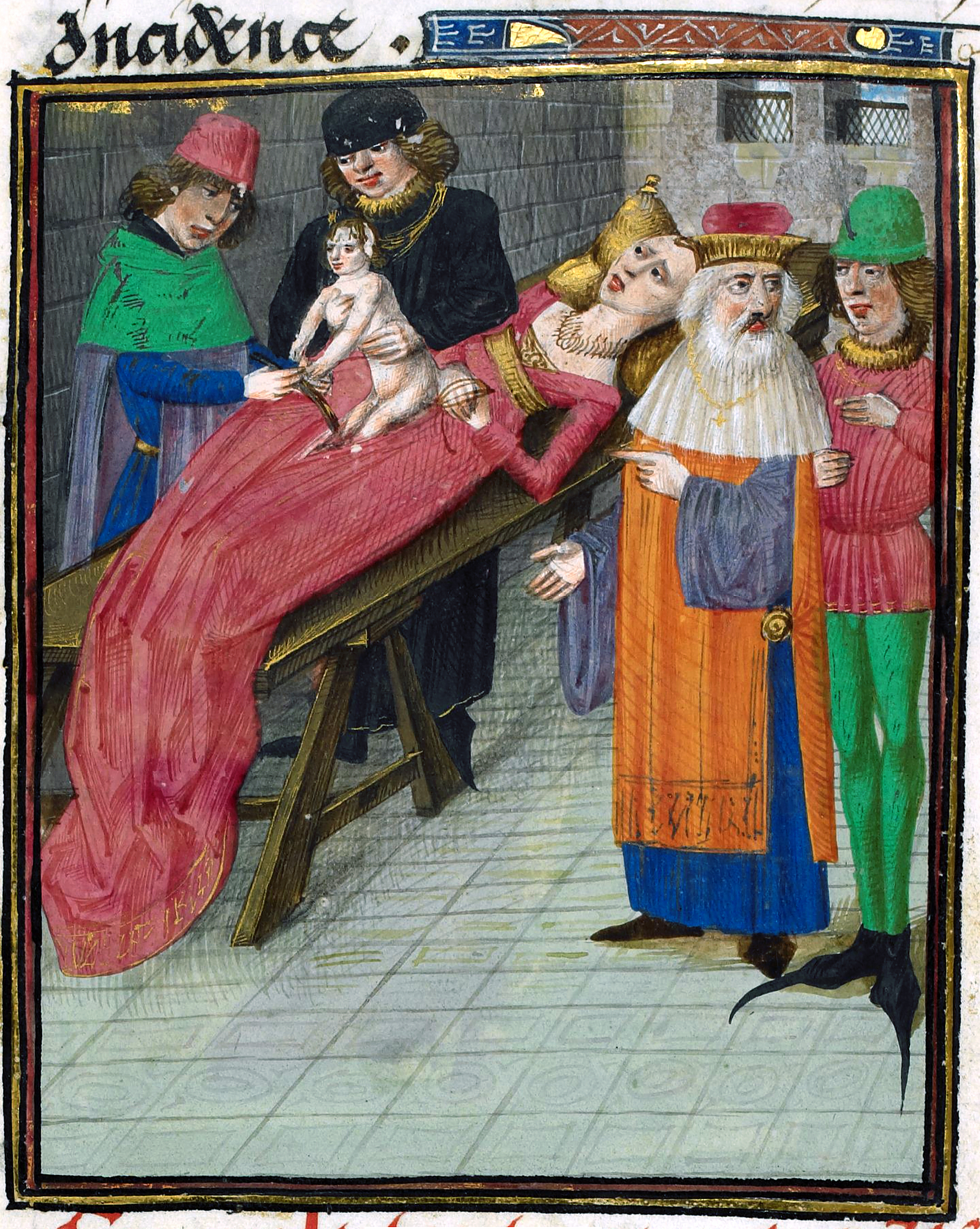
Fictional 15th-century depiction of the birth of Julius Caesar

The origin of the term is not definitively known. Roman Lex Regia (royal law), later the Lex Caesarea (imperial law), of Numa Pompilius (715–673 BC), required the child of a mother who had died during childbirth to be cut from her womb. There was a cultural taboo that mothers should not be buried pregnant, that may have reflected a way of saving some fetuses. Roman practice required a living mother to be in her tenth month of pregnancy before resorting to the procedure, reflecting the knowledge that she could not survive the delivery.

Speculations that the Roman dictator Julius Caesar was born by the method now known as C-section are false. Although caesarean sections were performed in Roman times, no classical source records a mother surviving such a delivery, while Caesar's mother lived for years after his birth. As late as the 12th century, scholar and physician Maimonides expresses doubt over the possibility of a woman's surviving this procedure and again becoming pregnant. The term has also been explained as deriving from the verb caedere, 'to cut', with children delivered this way referred to as caesones. Pliny the Elder refers to a certain Julius Caesar (an ancestor of the famous Roman statesman) as ab utero caeso, 'cut from the womb' giving this as an explanation for the cognomen Caesar which was then carried by his descendants. Nonetheless, the false etymology has been widely repeated until recently. For example, the first (1888) and second (1989) editions of the Oxford English Dictionary say that caesarean birth "was done in the case of Julius Cæsar". More recent dictionaries are more diffident: the online edition of the OED (2021) mentions "the traditional belief that Julius Cæsar was delivered this way", and Merriam-Webster's Collegiate Dictionary (2003) says "from the legendary association of such a delivery with the Roman cognomen Caesar".

The word Caesar, meaning either Julius Caesar or an emperor in general, is also borrowed or calqued in the name of the procedure in many other European languages and beyond.

Finally, the Roman praenomen (given name) Caeso was said to be given to children who were born via C-section. While this was probably just folk etymology made popular by Pliny the Elder, it was well known by the time the term came into common use.

=== Spelling ===
The term caesarean is spelled in various accepted ways, as discussed at Wiktionary. The Medical Subject Headings (MeSH) of the United States National Library of Medicine (NLM) uses cesarean section, while some other American medical works, e.g. Saunders Comprehensive Veterinary Dictionary, use caesarean, as do most British works. The online versions of the US-published Merriam-Webster Dictionary and American Heritage Dictionary list cesarean first and other spellings as "variants".

== Society and culture ==
=== Court cases ===
In re A.C., 573 A.2d 1235 (1990), was a District of Columbia Court of Appeals case. It was the first American appellate court case decided against a forced Caesarean section, although the decision was issued after the fatal procedure was performed. Physicians performed a Caesarean section upon patient Angela Carder (née Stoner) without informed consent in an unsuccessful attempt to save the life of her baby. The case stands as a landmark in United States case law establishing the rights of informed consent and bodily integrity for pregnant women.

In Illinois, In re Baby Boy Doe, 632 N.E.2d 326 (Ill. App. Ct. 1994) was a court case holding that courts may not balance whatever rights a fetus may have against the rights of a competent woman, whose choice to refuse medical treatment as invasive as a Cesarean section must be honored even if the choice may be harmful to the fetus.

Pemberton v. Tallahassee Memorial Regional Center, 66 F. Supp. 2d 1247 (N.D. Fla. 1999) is a case in the United States regarding reproductive rights. Pemberton had a previous Caesarean section (vertical incision), and with her second child, attempted to have a VBAC (vaginal birth after c-section). When a doctor she had approached about a related issue at the Tallahassee Memorial Regional Center found out, he and the hospital sued to force her to get a c-section. The court held that the rights of the fetus at or near birth outweighed the rights of Pemberton to determine her own medical care. She was physically forced to stop laboring, and taken to the hospital, where a c-section was performed. Her suit against the hospital was dismissed. The court held that a cesarean section at the end of a full-term pregnancy was here deemed to be medically necessary by doctors to avoid a substantial risk that the fetus would die during delivery due to uterine rupture, a risk of 4–6% according to the hospital's doctors and 2% according to Pemberton's doctors. Furthermore, the court held that a state's interest in preserving the life of an unborn child outweighed the mother's constitutional interest in bodily integrity. The court held that Roe v. Wade was not applicable, because bearing an unwanted child is a greater intrusion on the mother's constitutional interests than undergoing a cesarean section to deliver a child that the mother affirmatively desires to deliver. The court further distinguished In re A.C. by stating that it left open the possibility that a non-consenting patient's interest would yield to a more compelling countervailing interest in an "extremely rare and truly exceptional case." The court then held this case to be such.

=== Presence of father ===
In many hospitals, the mother's partner is encouraged to attend the surgery to support her and share the experience. While traditionally there has been an opaque surgical drape obstructing the parents' view, some patients and doctors are opting for a "gentle C-section" using a clear drape, allowing the parents to watch the delivery and see their infant immediately.

=== Special cases ===
In Judaism, there is a dispute among the poskim (Rabbinic authorities) as to whether the first-born son from a caesarean section has the laws of a bechor. Traditionally, a male child delivered by caesarean is not eligible for the Pidyon HaBen dedication ritual.

In rare cases, caesarean sections can be used to remove a dead fetus; otherwise, the woman has to labour and deliver a baby known to be a stillbirth. A late-term abortion using caesarean section procedures is termed a hysterotomy abortion and is very rarely performed.

The mother may perform a caesarean section on herself; there have been successful cases, such as Inés Ramírez Pérez of Mexico, who, on 5 March 2000, took this action. She survived, as did her son, Orlando Ruiz Ramírez.

In 2024, a female western lowland gorilla had a successful cesarean section after zoo veterinarians diagnosed her with pre-eclampsia. The premature gorilla infant survived as a result of similar methods used with human infants.
