= Jacob Nufer =

Swiss swineherd (fl. 1500)

Jacob Nufer (fl. 1500), sometimes given as Jacques Nufu or as James Nufer, was a Swiss swineherd and pig gelder (a person who castrates pigs) who in 1500 may have performed one of the earliest successful Caesarean sections on a living woman who survived. The woman, his wife Elisabeth Alespachin, had been in labour for multiple days. Both Alespachin and the baby boy recovered quickly afterward; Alespachin went on to bear five or six more children, and the boy lived to 77. Nufer's procedure was first related in the 1580s by Caspar Bauhin. Historians have doubted whether the operation occurred as Bauhin described, and have speculated that Alespachin may have instead been carrying an extrauterine pregnancy.

== Background ==
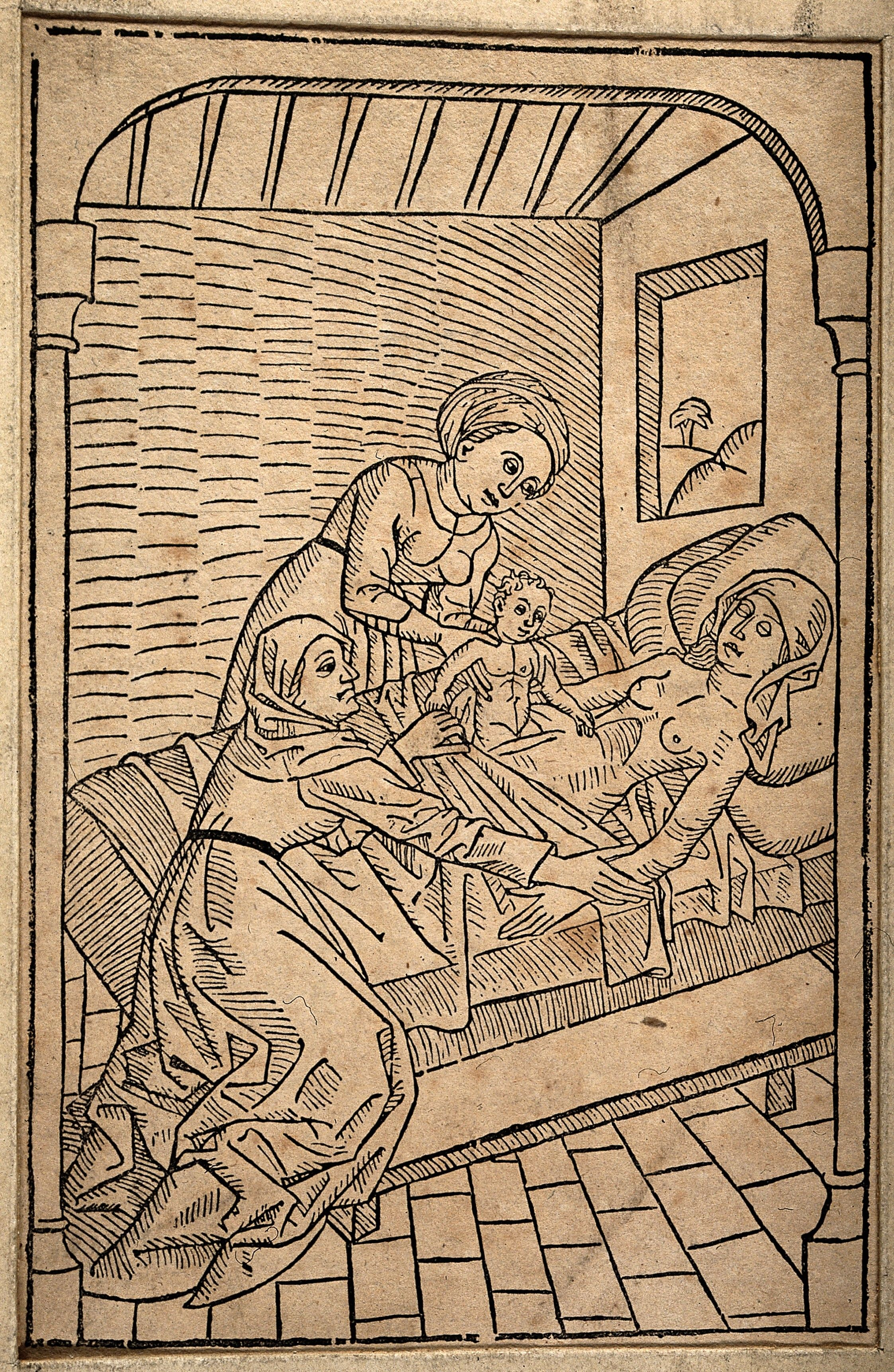
1483 woodcut of a baby being removed, via Caesarean section, from its dying mother's womb

Caesarean sections were, until technical improvements were made in the late 19th century that decreased the procedure's mortality rate, performed chiefly on women who were either dying or already deceased. The procedure would be carried out for one of two reasons: to prevent the infant's death, or to allow the mother and baby's remains to be interred apart per religious customs. Living women who underwent Caesarean sections at the time almost invariably exsanguinated or died of sepsis. There have been accounts, predating Nufer, of mothers supposedly surviving Caesarean sections. Nufer had never before performed a surgery on a human, so he applied his knowledge of pig anatomy to the operation. Nufer was illiterate and lived in Siegershausen, in the canton of Thurgau in northern Switzerland.

== Caesarean section ==
In 1500, Nufer's wife, Elisabeth Alespachin, went into labour while pregnant with their first child. She was still, after multiple days, unable to deliver. Several lithotomists and thirteen midwives deemed Alespachin a lost cause, so Nufer decided to operate on her himself upon gaining the magistrate or mayor's permission. Before the operation all the midwives, except for the two who did not oppose the procedure, left the room. Nufer laid Alespachin onto a table and, with the same method used to perform a version of a Caesarean section on a pregnant sow, proceeded to cut Alespachin's uterus open and sew the wound closed after removing the infant, which was a boy. The uterus was probably not stitched closed. This was usual practice during the time period: surgeons feared that infections would result from internal sutures and believed, erroneously, that uterine contractions would naturally close the wound. After the baby was washed, the midwives who had left the room were allowed back in. Alespachin and the boy recovered a few days afterward.

The infant was healthy and lived to the age of 77; Alespachin lived to at least 60. Alespachin went on to bear five or six more children, including one set of twins; one of the twins, John Nufer, became a judge of Siegershausen and was alive as of 1583.

The case was not reported upon until over eighty years after the fact, in the 1580s, by Caspar Bauhin in the appendix of his Latin translation of French physician Francois Rousset's 1581 obstetrical treatise Traitte Nouveau de l'hysterotomotokie, ou enfantement Caesarien (A New Treatise on Hysterotomy, or Caesarean Delivery). The fact of Alespachin's subsequent uncomplicated vaginal deliveries has led historians to speculate that the pregnancy may have been grown in her abdomen instead of in her uterus, and doubt that the operation ever occurred. The historian Renate Blumenfeld-Kosinski writes, however, that "[t]wo factors argue against [the possibility of an extrauterine pregnancy]... the mother's extended labor and the good health of the child".
