= Shoulder presentation =

Childbirth in which the arm, shoulder, or trunk emerges first

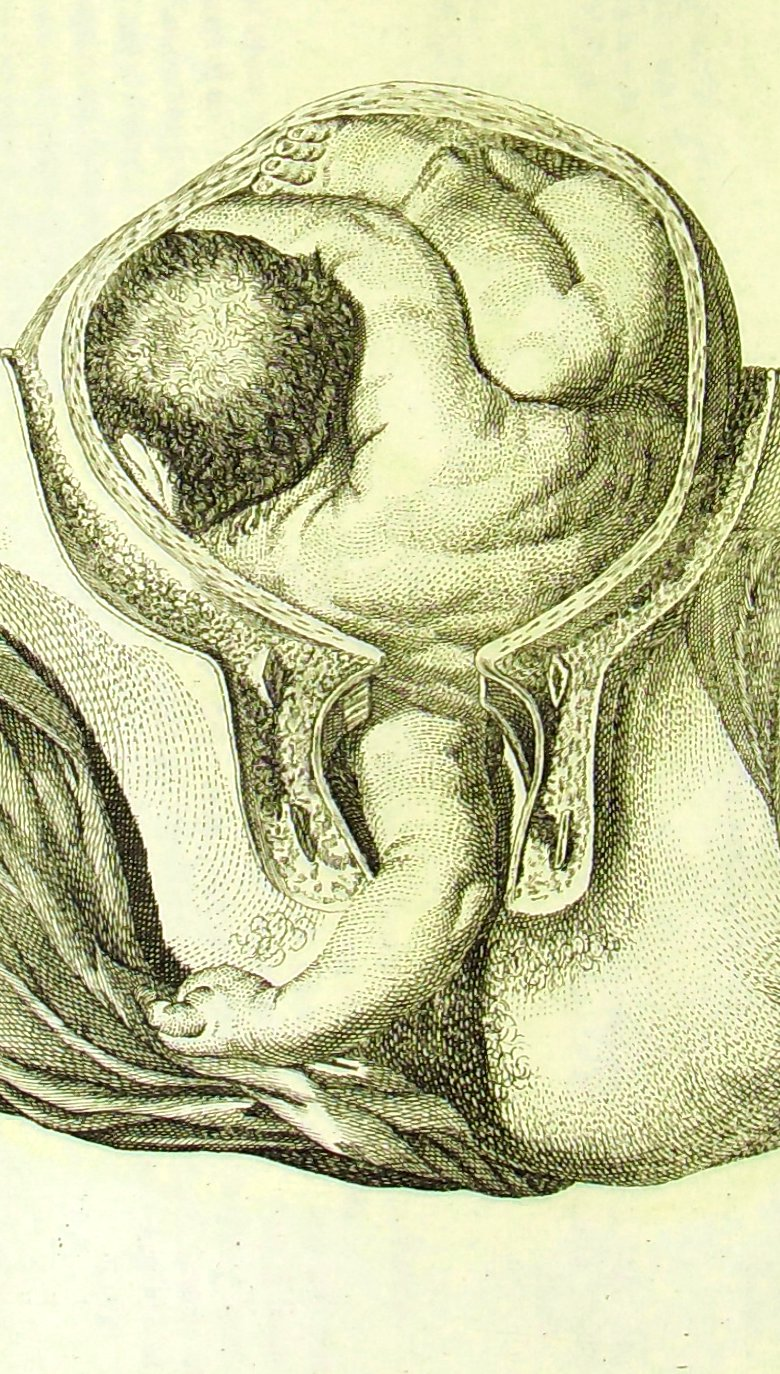
- A shoulder presentation with a prolapsed arm, by William Smellie
- Specialty: Obstetrics

In obstetrics, a shoulder presentation is a malpresentation at childbirth where the baby is in a transverse lie (its vertebral column is perpendicular to that of the mother), thus the leading part (the part that first enters the birth canal) is an arm, a shoulder, or the trunk. While a baby can be delivered vaginally when either the head or the feet/buttocks are the leading part, it usually cannot be expected to be delivered successfully with a shoulder presentation unless a cesarean section (C/S) is performed.

== Frequency and causes ==
Shoulder presentations are uncommon (about 0.5% of births) since, usually, toward the end of gestation, either the head or the buttocks start to enter the upper part of the pelvis, anchoring the fetus in a longitudinal lie. It is not known in all cases of shoulder presentation why the longitudinal line is not reached, but possible causes include bony abnormalities of the pelvis, uterine abnormalities such as malformations or tumors (fibroids), or other tumors in the pelvis or abdomen. Other factors are a lax abdominal musculature, uterine overdistension (i.e., polyhydramnios), multiple gestation, placenta previa, a small fetus, or a fetus with some abnormality. Further, if the amniotic fluid sac ruptures, the shoulder or arm may become wedged as a shoulder presentation.

== Diagnosis ==
Inspection of the abdomen may already give a clue as it is wide from side to side. Usually performing the Leopold's maneuvers will demonstrate the transverse lie of the fetus. Ultrasound examination delivers the diagnosis and may indicate possible causes such as multiple gestation or a tumor. On vaginal examination, the absence of a head or feet/breech is apparent.

Shoulder presentations are classified into four types, based on the location of the scapula:

- Left scapula-anterior (LSA)
- Right scapula-anterior (RSA)
- Left scapula-posterior (LSP)
- Right scapula-posterior (RSP)

== Management ==
While a transverse lie prior to labor can be manually versed to a longitudinal lie, once the uterus starts contracting the uterus normally will not allow any version procedure. A shoulder presentation is an indication for a caesarean section. Generally, as it is diagnosed early, the baby is not damaged by the time of delivery. With the rupture of the membranes, there is an increased risk of a cord prolapse as the shoulder may not completely block the birth canal. Thus the caesarean section is ideally performed before the membranes break.

=== Delivery of the second twin ===
The delivery of the second twin in a transverse lie with a shoulder presentation represents a special situation that may be amenable to a vaginal delivery. As the first twin has just been delivered and the cervix is fully dilated the obstetrician may perform an internal version, that is inserting one hand into the uterus, find the baby’s feet, and then bring the baby into a breech position and deliver the baby as such.

=== Impaction ===
During labor the shoulder will be wedged into the pelvis and the head lie in one iliac fossa, the breech in the other. With further uterine contractions the baby suffocates. The uterus continues to try to expel the impacted fetus and as its retraction ring rises, the musculature in the lower segments thins out leading eventually to a uterine rupture and the death of the mother. Impacted shoulder presentations contribute to maternal mortality. Obviously a cesarean section should be performed before the baby has died, but even when the baby has died or impaction has occurred, C/S is the method of choice of delivery, as alternative methods of delivery are potentially too traumatic for the mother. If the baby is preterm or macerated and very small a spontaneous delivery has been observed.

== History ==
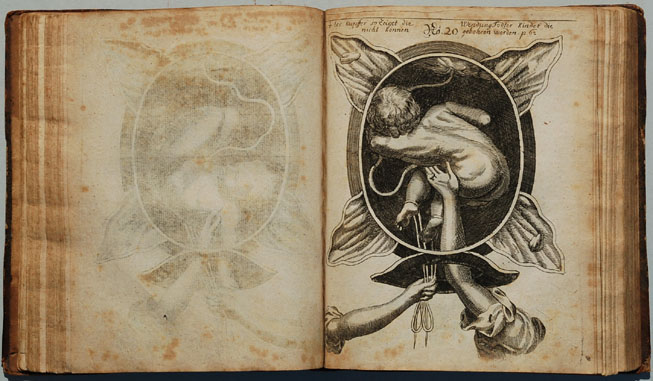
Internal version according to Siegemundin, 1690

Prior to the arrival of C/S the fetus usually died during protracted labor and the mother's life was at risk as well due to infection, uterine rupture and bleeding. On occasion, if the baby was macerated and small, it collapsed sufficiently to be delivered. The shoulder presentation was a feared obstetrical complication.

In 1690 Justine Siegemundin, a German midwife, published Die Kgl. Preußische und Chur-Brandenburgische Hof-Wehemutter. This treatise for midwives demonstrated abnormal presentations at birth and their management. She was the first to describe a two-handed method of performing an internal rotation of the baby to extract it as a breech (a variation of which is performed today on the second twin, see above) using a sling. The procedure was useful provided the fetus was not impacted. Once the uterus had contracted around the baby tightly, destructive interventions were used to save the life of the mother.

== See also ==
- Presentation (obstetrics)
