= Cephalic presentation =

Childbirth in which the head emerges first

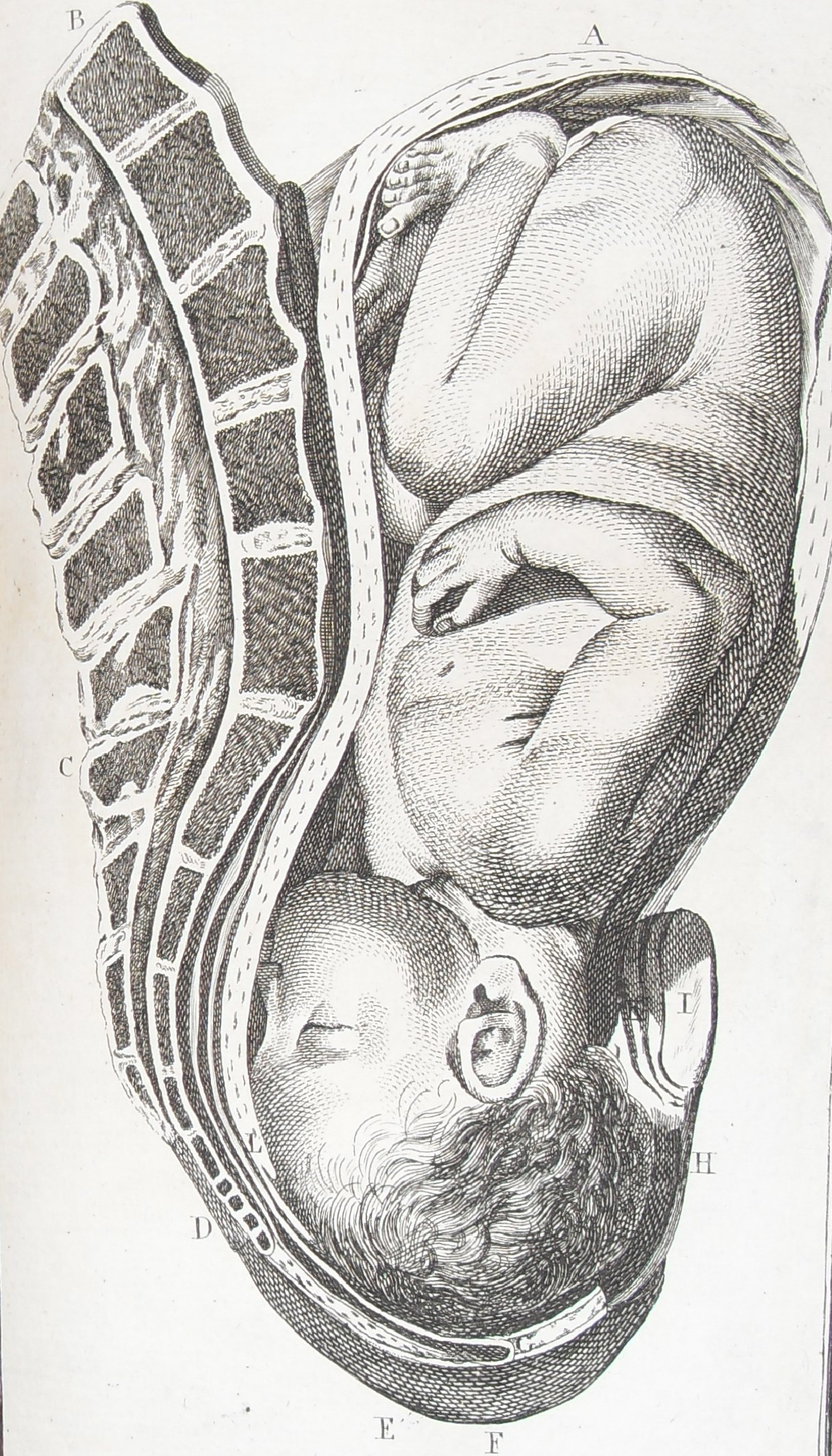
- Vertex presentation, occiput anterior, William Smellie, 1792
- Specialty: Obstetrics

In obstetrics, a cephalic presentation or head presentation or head-first presentation is a situation at childbirth where the fetus is in a longitudinal lie and the head enters the pelvis first; the most common form of cephalic presentation is the vertex presentation, where the occiput is the leading part (the part that first enters the birth canal). All other presentations are abnormal (malpresentations) and are either more difficult to deliver or not deliverable by natural means.

== Engagement ==
The movement of the fetus to cephalic presentation is called head engagement. It occurs in the third trimester. In head engagement, the fetal head descends into the pelvic cavity so that only a small part (or none) of it can be felt abdominally. The perineum and cervix are further flattened and the head may be felt vaginally. Head engagement is known colloquially as the baby drop, and in natural medicine as the lightening because of the release of pressure on the upper abdomen and renewed ease in breathing. However, it severely reduces bladder capacity resulting in a need to void more frequently.

== Classification ==
In the vertex presentation, the head is flexed and the occiput leads the way. This is the most common configuration and seen at term in 95% of singletons. If the head is extended, the face becomes the leading part. Face presentations account for less than 1% of presentations at term. In the sinicipital presentation, the large fontanelle is the presenting part; with further labor the head will either flex or extend more so that in the end this presentation leads to a vertex or face presentation. In the brow presentation, the head is slightly extended, but less than in the face presentation. The chin presentation is a variant of the face presentation with maximum extension of the head.

Non-cephalic presentations are the breech presentation (3.5%) and the shoulder presentation (0.5%).

=== Vertex presentation ===
The vertex is the area of the vault bounded anteriorly by the anterior fontanelle and the coronal suture, posteriorly by the posterior fontanelle and the lambdoid suture and laterally by 2 lines passing through the parietal eminences.

In the vertex presentation, the occiput typically is anterior and thus in an optimal position to negotiate the pelvic curve by extending the head. In an occiput posterior position, labor becomes prolonged, and more operative interventions are deemed necessary. The prevalence of the persistent occiput posterior is given as 4.7%.

The vertex presentations are further classified according to the position of the occiput, both right, left, or transverse and anterior or posterior:

- Left Occipito-Anterior (LOA), Left Occipito-Posterior (LOP), Left Occipito-Transverse (LOT)
- Right Occipito-Anterior (ROA), Right Occipito-Posterior (ROP), Right Occipito-Transverse (ROT)

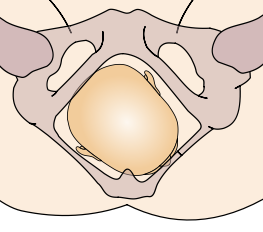
Right occipito-anterior

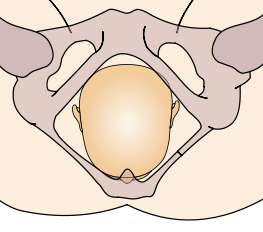
Straight occipito-anterior

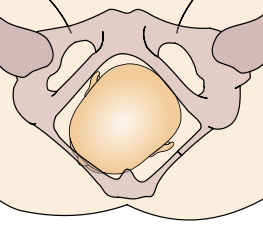
Left occipito-anterior

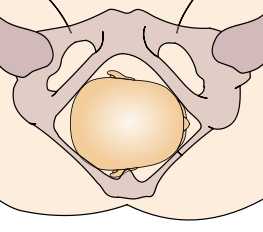
Right occipito-transverse

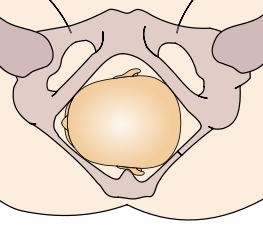
Left occipito-transverse

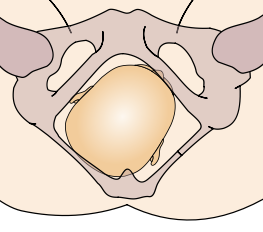
Right occipito-posterior

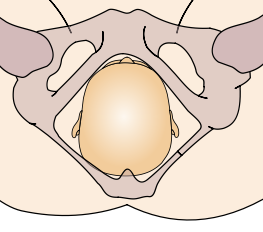
Straight occipito-posterior

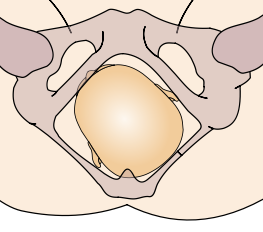
Left occipito-posterior

The occipito-anterior position is ideal for birth; it means that the baby is lined up so as to fit through the pelvis as easily as possible. The baby is head down, facing the spine, with their back anterior. In this position, the baby's chin is tucked onto their chest, so that the smallest part of their head will be applied to the cervix first. The position is usually "Left Occiput Anterior", or LOA. Occasionally, the baby may be "Right Occiput Anterior", or ROA.

=== Face presentation ===
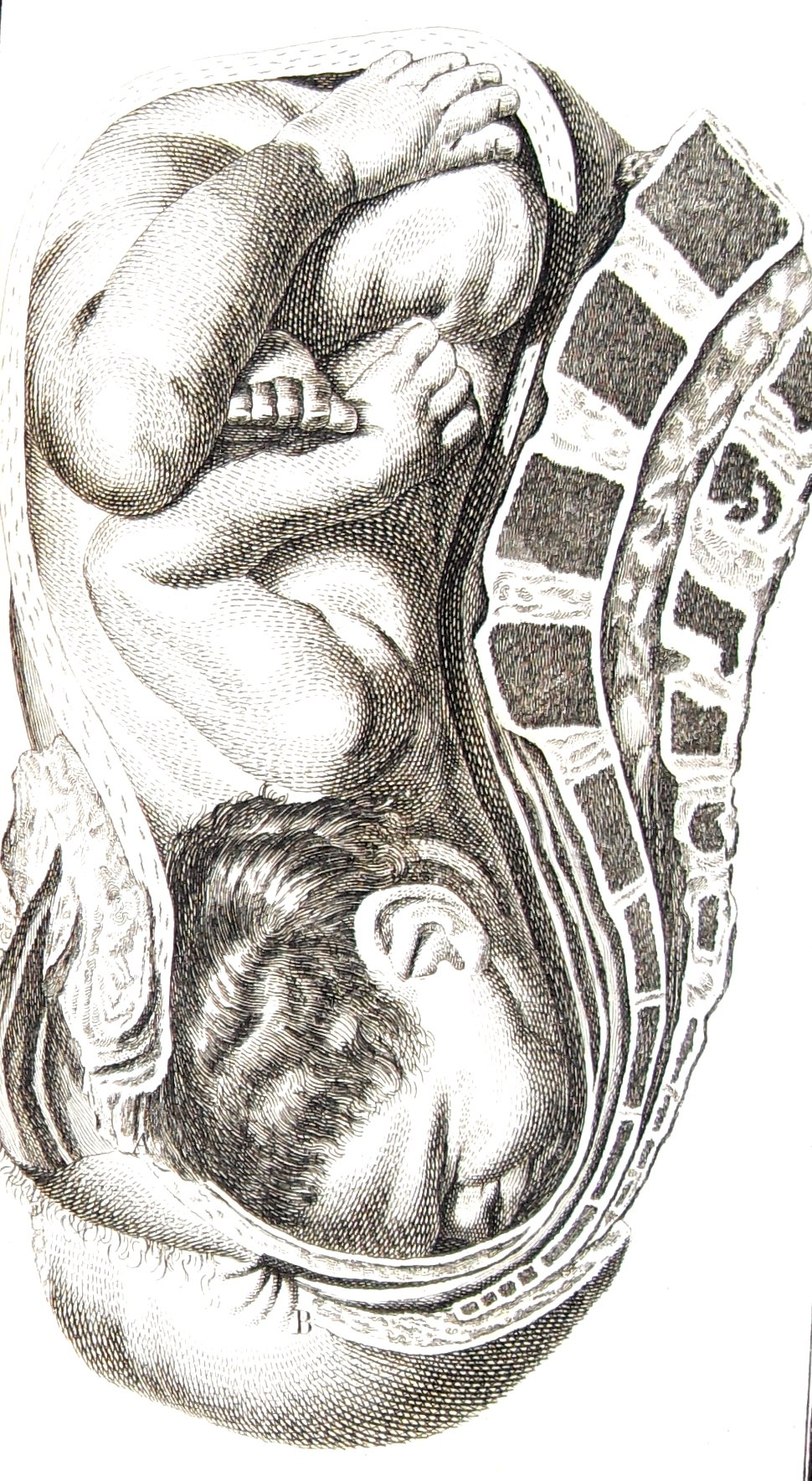
A mento-posterior face presentation, William Smellie, 1792

Factors that predispose to face presentation are prematurity, macrosomia, anencephaly and other malformations, cephalopelvic disproportion, and polyhydramnios. In an uncomplicated face presentation, duration of labor is not altered. Perinatal losses with face presentation occur with traumatic version and extraction and midforceps procedures Duff indicates that the prevalence of face presentations is about 1/500–600, while Benedetti et al. found it to be 1/1,250 term deliveries.

Face presentations are classified according to the position of the chin (mentum):

- Left Mento-Anterior (LMA), Left Mento-Posterior (LMP), Left Mento-Transverse (LMT)
- Right Mento-Anterior (RMA), Right Mento-Posterior (RMP), Right Mento-Transverse (RMT)

=== Brow presentation ===
While some consider the brow presentation as an intermediate stage towards the face presentation, others disagree. Thus Bhal et al. indicated that both conditions are about equally common (1/994 face and 1/755 brow positions), and that prematurity was more common with face while postmaturity was more common with brow positions.

== Reasons for predominance ==
The piriform (pear-shaped) morphology of the uterus has been given as the major cause for the finding that most singletons favor the cephalic presentation at term. The fundus is larger and thus a fetus will adapt its position so that the bulkier and more movable podalic pole makes use of it, while the head moves to the opposite site. Factors that influence this positioning include the gestational age (earlier in gestation breech presentations are more common as the head is relatively bigger), size of the head, malformations, amount of amniotic fluid, presence of multiple gestations, presence of tumors, and others.

== Diagnosis ==
Usually performing the Leopold maneuvers will demonstrate the presentation and possibly the position of the fetus. Ultrasound examination delivers the precise diagnosis and may indicate possible causes of a malpresentation. On vaginal examination, the leading part of the fetus becomes identifiable after the amniotic sac has been broken and the head is descending in the pelvis.

== Management ==
Many factors determine the optimal way to deliver a baby. A vertex presentation is the ideal situation for a vaginal birth, although occiput posterior positions tend to proceed more slowly, often requiring intervention in the form of forceps, vacuum extraction, or caesarean section. In a large study, a majority of brow presentations were delivered by caesarean section, however, because of 'postmaturity', factors other than labour dynamics may have played a role. Most face presentations can be delivered vaginally as long as the chin is anterior; there is no increase in fetal or maternal mortality. Mento-posterior positions cannot be delivered vaginally in most cases (unless rotated) and are candidates for caesarean section in contemporary management.
