= Birth trauma (physical) =

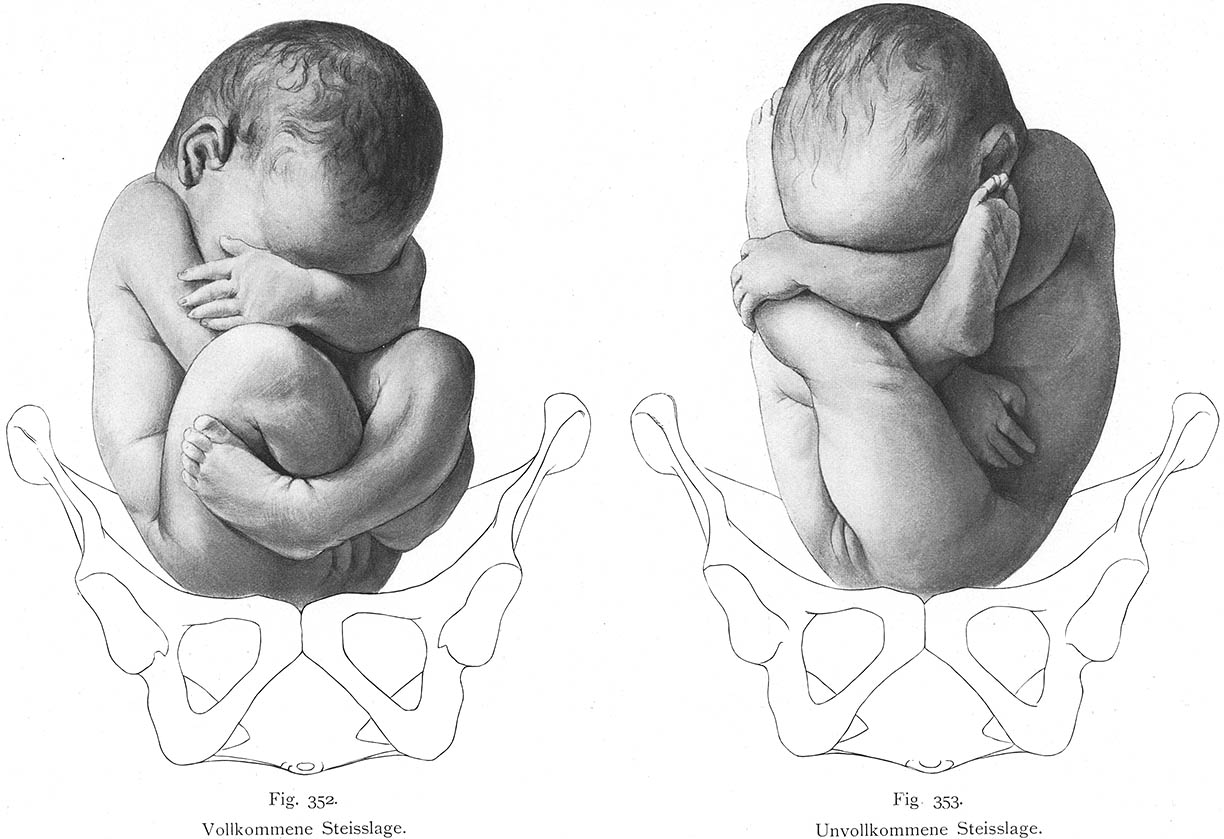
- Position of the child is important for normal birthing procedure. Head-first birth is preferred.
- Specialty: Obstetrics, pediatrics

Birth trauma refers to damage of the tissues and organs of a newly delivered child, often as a result of physical pressure or trauma during childbirth. It encompasses the long term consequences, often of cognitive nature, of damage to the brain or cranium. Medical study of birth trauma dates to the 16th century, and the morphological consequences of mishandled delivery are described in Renaissance-era medical literature. Birth injury occupies a unique area of concern and study in the medical canon. In ICD-10 "birth trauma" occupied 49 individual codes (P10–Р15).

However, there are often clear distinctions to be made between brain damage caused by birth trauma and that induced by intrauterine asphyxia. It is also crucial to distinguish between "birth trauma" and "birth injury". Birth injuries encompass any systemic damages incurred during delivery (hypoxic, toxic, biochemical, infection factors, etc.), but "birth trauma" focuses largely on mechanical damage. Caput succedaneum, bruises, bleeding along the displacements of cranial bones, and subcapsular hematomas of the liver are among reported birth injuries. Birth trauma, on the other hand, encompasses the enduring side effects of physical birth injuries, including the ensuing compensatory and adaptive mechanisms and the development of pathological processes (pathogenesis) after the damage.

== Signs and symptoms ==
Complications from birth trauma can include damage to the head, spinal cord, soft tissues, and organs.

Trauma to the head of the infant can manifest as caput succedaneum, skull fractures, extracranial and intracranial hemorrhages, and cranial nerve injuries. Caput succeedaneum is seen as edema in the scalp due to squeezing of the veins from increased pressure while passing through the birth canal.

Birth trauma is uncommon in the Western world in relation to rates in the third world. In the West injury occurs in 1.1% of C-sections.

== Causes ==
- cephalopelvic disproportion
- rapid delivery
- delayed and prolonged delivery
- abnormal birth position
- asynclitic birth (asinclitismus)
- abnormal fetal attitude (extensor inserting head)
- obstetric turn
- acceleration and stimulation of birth
- breech presentation
- forceps and vacuum extraction

While any number of injuries may occur during the birthing process, a number of specific conditions are well described. Brachial plexus palsy occurs in 0.4 to 5.1 infants per 1000 live births. Head trauma and brain damage during delivery can lead to a number of conditions include: caput succedaneum, cephalohematoma, subgaleal hemorrhage, subdural hemorrhage, subarachnoid hemorrhage, epidural hemorrhage, and intraventricular hemorrhage.

The most common fracture during delivery is that of the clavicle (0.5%).

== Epidemiology ==
Disability-adjusted life year for birth asphyxia and birth trauma per 100,000 inhabitants in 2002 no data less than 150 150–300 300–450 450–600 600–750 750–900 900–1050 1050–1200 1200–1350 1350–1500 1500–1750 more than 1750
