= Birth injury =

Injury to a child before, during, or just after birth

Birth injury refers to damage or injury to the child before, during, or just after the birthing process. "Birth trauma" refers specifically to mechanical damage sustained during delivery (such as nerve damage and broken bones).

The term "birth injury" may be used in two different ways:

1. the ICD-10 uses "birth injury" and "birth trauma" interchangeably to refer to mechanical injuries sustained during delivery;
2. the legal community uses "birth injury" to refer to any damage or injury sustained during pregnancy, during delivery, or just after delivery, including injuries caused by trauma.

Birth injuries must be distinguished from birth defects. "Birth defect" refers to damage that occurs while the fetus is in the womb, which may be caused by genetic mutations, infections, or exposure to toxins. There are more than 4,000 types of birth defects.

== Causes ==
=== Difficult labor (dystocia) ===
Difficult labor, also known as dystocia or obstructed labor, occurs when the child cannot easily pass through the birth canal. This can result in fetal distress or physical trauma to the child, especially broken clavicles and damage to the brachial plexus nerves. It can also deprive the child of oxygen as the umbilical cord is pinched, potentially causing brain damage or death.

Difficult labor may occur because the baby is abnormally large (macrosomia), because the mother's pelvis or birth canal is small or deformed, or because the baby is in an abnormal presentation for the birth (such as breech or transverse presentation).

=== External causes ===
Fetal malformations and birth injuries may occur as a result of exposure to environmental toxins such as mercury or lead. Many medications can also affect the development of the fetus, as can alcohol, tobacco, and illicit drugs. Birth injuries may also occur during delivery and labor, in some cases as a result of medical malpractice.

=== Genetic mutations ===
Genetic mutations can cause a wide variety of fetal malformations, ranging from relatively mild cleft lips to severe and even fatal deformities.

=== Infection ===
Maternal infection may be transmitted to the fetus; this is called a vertically transmitted infection. The fetus has a weak immune system, so infections that are relatively minor in adults can be serious in a developing fetus. In addition, some studies suggest that maternal infections increase the risk of neurodevelopmental disorders, including schizophrenia, in the child.

=== Intrauterine hypoxia ===
Intrauterine hypoxia, or oxygen deprivation in the womb, can cause serious brain damage in the fetus. It most commonly occurs because of damage to or malformation of the umbilical cord or placenta. Intrauterine hypoxia can cause brain damage, including cerebral palsy and other neurological and psychiatric disorders.

=== Maternal health issues ===
Certain maternal health issues can cause birth injuries. Gestational diabetes can cause premature birth, macrosomia, or stillbirth.

=== Pregnancy complications ===
Complications such as placenta previa, placental abruption, placenta accreta, retained placenta, placental insufficiency, placental infarcts, anemia, and preeclampsia can limit the supply of oxygen and nutrients to the fetus, increasing the risk of birth defects. Severe cases may be fatal to the fetus.

== Common types of birth injury ==
=== Brachial plexus injury ===
The brachial plexus is the plexus of nerves that lies between the neck and axilla and controls the motion of the arm and hand. The brachial plexus may be stretched and damaged during a difficult delivery. In minor cases, the nerves heal and full use of the hand and arm is recovered. In more severe cases, the child may sustain permanent nerve damage and may not have full use of the shoulder, arm, or hand. Brachial plexus injuries occur in 1–3 children per 1,000 live births.

See Erb's palsy and Klumpke's palsy.

=== Brain damage ===
Brain damage may be caused by a number of factors, including fetal malformation due to genetic mutation or exposure to toxins, intrauterine hypoxia, or physical trauma during delivery.

Cerebral palsy is one example of brain damage incurred before or during delivery; about 10,000 children are diagnosed with cerebral palsy every year.

=== Bruising ===
A difficult delivery may lead to bruising, especially on the head and face, from pressure against the mother's pelvis or pressure caused by forceps or a vacuum device (see ventouse) used in delivery.

=== Bone fractures ===
Bone fractures can occur during a difficult delivery. Fracture of the clavicle is the most common birth injury.

=== Meconium aspiration syndrome ===
Meconium is a sticky substance that usually makes up the child's first bowel movement. If the fetus is stressed before or during delivery, the meconium may be released and may mix with the amniotic fluid. If it gets into the child's airways or lungs, it can cause meconium aspiration syndrome. Serious cases may result in pneumonia or a collapsed lung.

== Legal issues ==
Birth injuries may be unavoidable or they may be attributable to medical malpractice. When a legal claim results, birth injury cases are a subset of medical malpractice cases. Legal claims from birth injury cases typically seek compensation for the medical costs associated with the injury, including ongoing therapeutic and medical support for the child.

In order to prevail in a birth injury malpractice case, the plaintiff must show:

1. that the medical care provider owed a duty to the child
2. that the medical care provider breached that duty by failing to meet the accepted standard of care
3. that the child sustained an injury that was caused by the medical care provider's breach of duty to the child, and
4. the child sustained damages as a result of the injury. All four elements must be present in order for the plaintiff to win
