= Caput succedaneum =

Scalp swelling in newborns due to pressure during birth

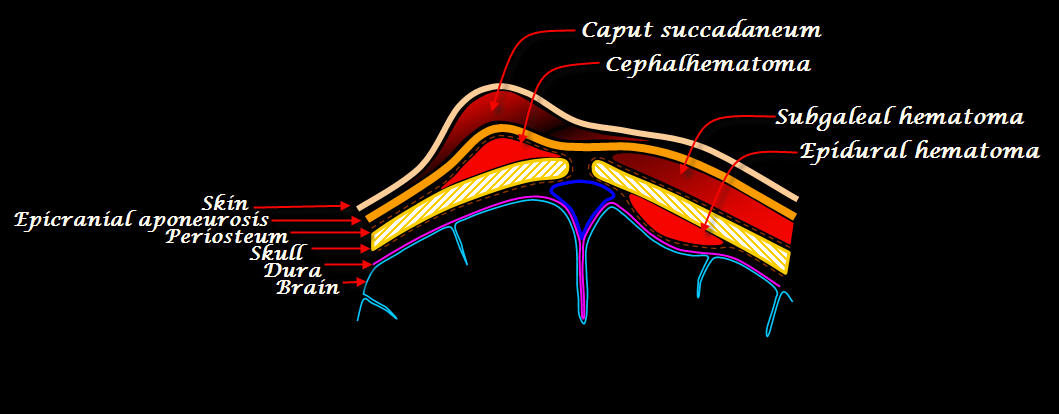
- Newborn Scalp bleeds
- Specialty: Pediatrics

Caput succedaneum is a benign neonatal condition involving a serosanguinous (containing blood and serum), subcutaneous, extra-periosteal fluid collection with poorly defined margins caused by the pressure on the presenting part of the fetal scalp by the vaginal walls and uterus as the infant passes through a narrowed cervix during delivery.

It involves bleeding below the scalp and above the periosteum.

== Etiology ==
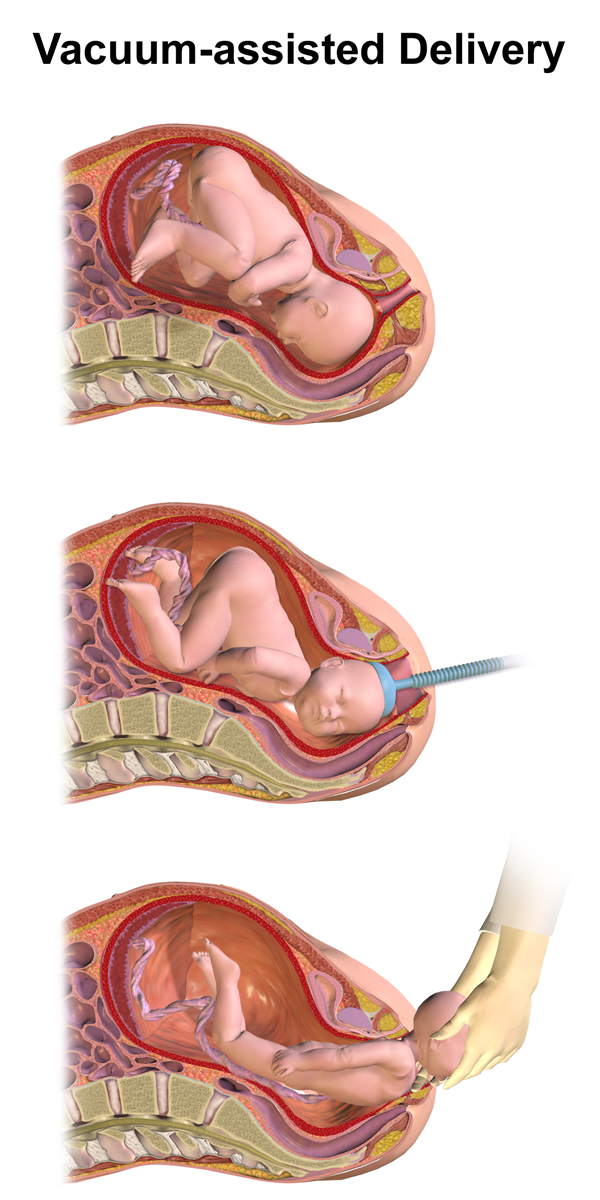
Vacuum extraction of an infant.

Risk factors for development of caput succedaneum include vertex presentation, vacuum-assisted delivery, forceps-assisted delivery, prolonged labor, maternal nulliparity, oligohydramnios, premature rupture of membranes, and macrosomia. The cause of the fluid collection is due to pressure on the fetal scalp by the vaginal walls and uterus during vaginal delivery. As one side of the infant's head is compressed during delivery, blood and lymph flow to the compressed side is obstructed. As a result, blood and lymph flow to the scalp opposite the side being compressed is unable to flow appropriately. This leads to blood and lymph accumulation, causing distension opposite the side of compression.

In the setting of vacuum-assisted delivery, a cup connected to vacuum pressure is placed onto the infant's scalp and used to provide extra pulling force on the head to assist with the birthing process during difficult or prolonged labor. The pressure from the vacuum along with the pulling force leads to injury and resultant swelling. This swelling is called a chignon, an artificial caput succedaneum.

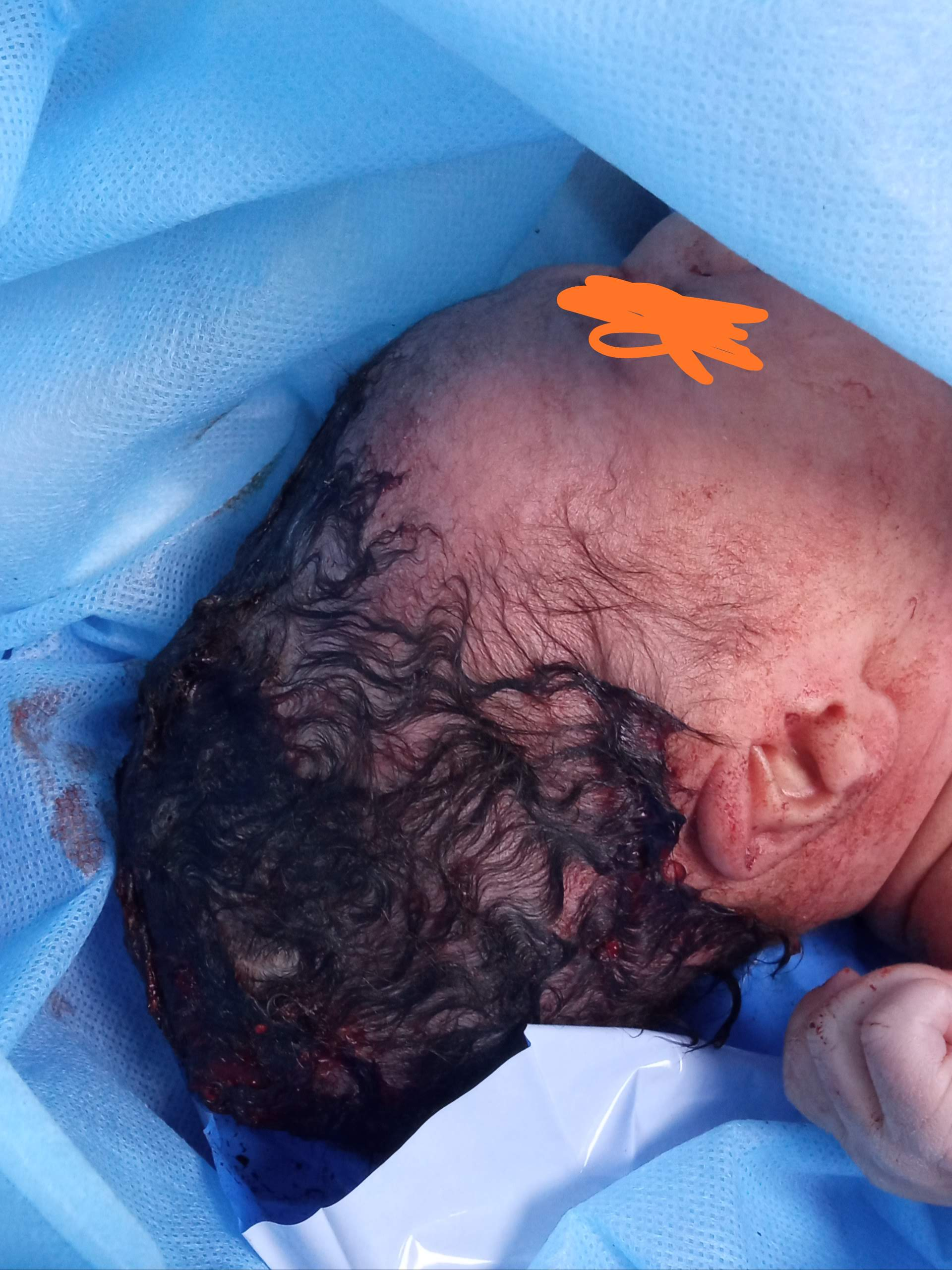
Close-up of a newborn with caput succedaneum

== Presentation ==
Caput succedaneum typically presents as a soft, boggy, uneven mass that crosses cranial suture lines. The size of the caput is typically 1-2 cm deep with a varying circumference dependent on degree of injury. Petechiae, purpura, and ecchymoses (bruises) may also be present. Since the fluid collection is not bound by suture lines, the swelling will shift with gravity as the baby's head is repositioned.

== Complications ==
Complications are rare with development of caput succedaneum. Possible complications include scarring, jaundice from ongoing red blood cell breakdown within the fluid collection, and halo scalp ring alopecia, a temporary form of alopecia resulting from prolonged pressure on the scalp during delivery.

== Treatment and Prognosis ==
Caput succedaneum is a benign, self-limited condition with typical treatment reserved to observation of the swelling and its resolution. Medical intervention is generally not required. Parents should be reassured that the condition is self-limited and not associated with any significant complications. Most cases will self-resolve within 48 hours after birth without any significant adverse long-term effects.

For infants with a large caput succedaneum that either does not resolve within 48 to 72 hours after birth or enlarges more than 24 hours after birth, imaging studies for further evaluation are indicated. Imaging studies are also appropriate for infants with caput succedaneum with worsening neurological status (e.g., decreased activity, trouble feeding, increased irritability) or those with signs of hemodynamic instability (e.g., low blood pressure, abnormal heart rate, blue skin color, cold skin, loss of consciousness).

== See also ==
- Birth trauma (physical)
- Cephalohematoma
- Chignon (medical term)
- Hematoma
- Neonatal jaundice
- Subgaleal hemorrhage
