= Jorge Odón =

Argentine inventor (born c. 1954)

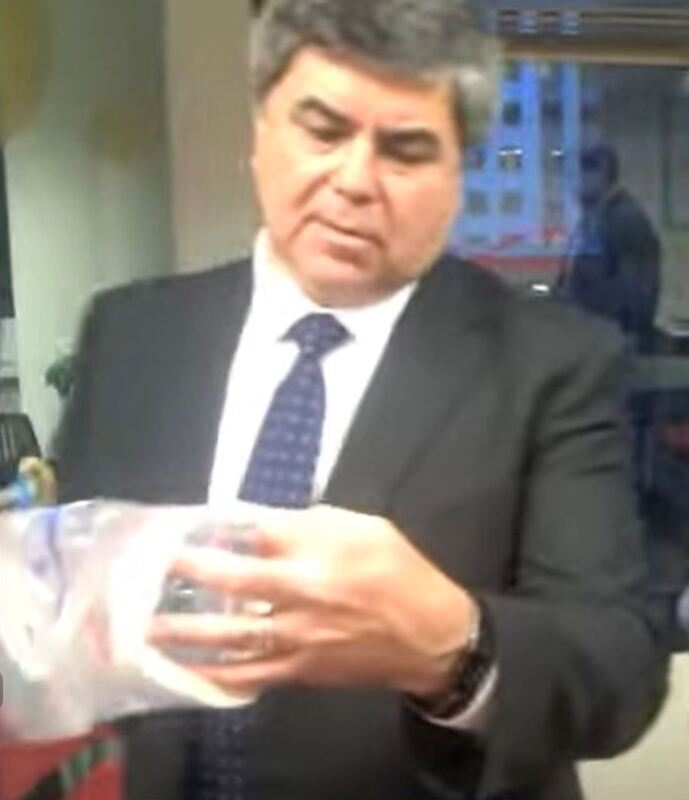
- Odón demonstrating the Odon device
- Born: c. 1954; Colón, Buenos Aires, Argentina
- Occupations: Inventor, auto mechanic
- Notable work: Odon device

Jorge Ernesto Odón (born c. 1954) is an Argentine inventor. Born in Colón, Buenos Aires, and of Syrian descent, Odón worked as an automobile mechanic in Lanús, Argentina. He ran a wheel balancing and alignment centre while simultaneously developing ideas for mechanical innovations in the automotive sector, inventions for which he holds a number of patents.

The eponymous invention for which he is best known is called the Odon device. The invention and its associated procedures were conceived to assist with difficult childbirth. It is intended to be less hazardous and invasive than vacuum extraction or the use of obstetrical forceps.

Odón's invention was inspired by a YouTube video of a party trick that uses an inflated plastic bag to remove a cork trapped inside of a wine bottle. After seeing this, Odón had the idea that the technique might be applicable to births requiring mechanical assistance. He subsequently spoke with an obstetrician who encouraged him to pursue the idea further. His first prototype of the device was made by sewing a sleeve onto a cloth bag. It was tested using a child's doll inserted into a glass jar.

In complicated deliveries, the device is positioned against the baby's scalp and the lubricated sleeve is gently inserted around the baby's head. Once a marker on the device indicates that it has been properly positioned, the applicator is removed and the sleeve's inner "air-cuff" is inflated, providing a strong grip on the baby's head. The inflated sleeve is used to help gently pull the baby's head through the vagina, facilitating delivery while reducing trauma and the risk of injury to both mother and child.

Odón's invention, known commercially as OdonAssist, has been tested by the World Health Organization in Argentina and South Africa. In 2025, OdonAssist gained Kitemark CE approval, which denotes that the device is considered safe for use in Europe. It was successfully tested in the United Kingdom at Southmead Hospital in Bristol, and as of 2026 had been used in continental Europe to deliver c. 300 babies.

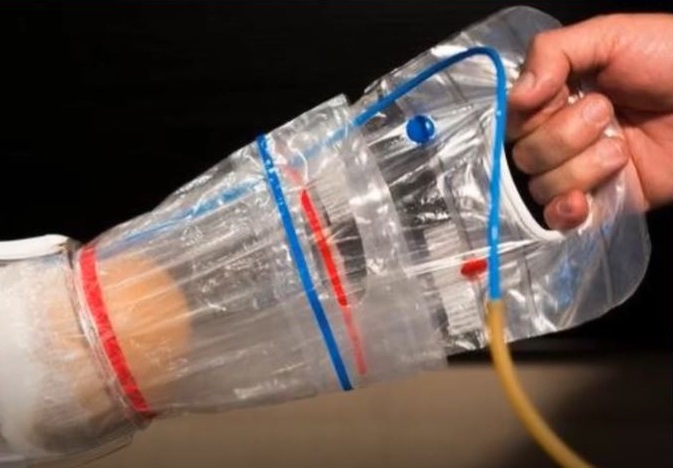
Odon device
