= Franz Naegele =

German obstetrician

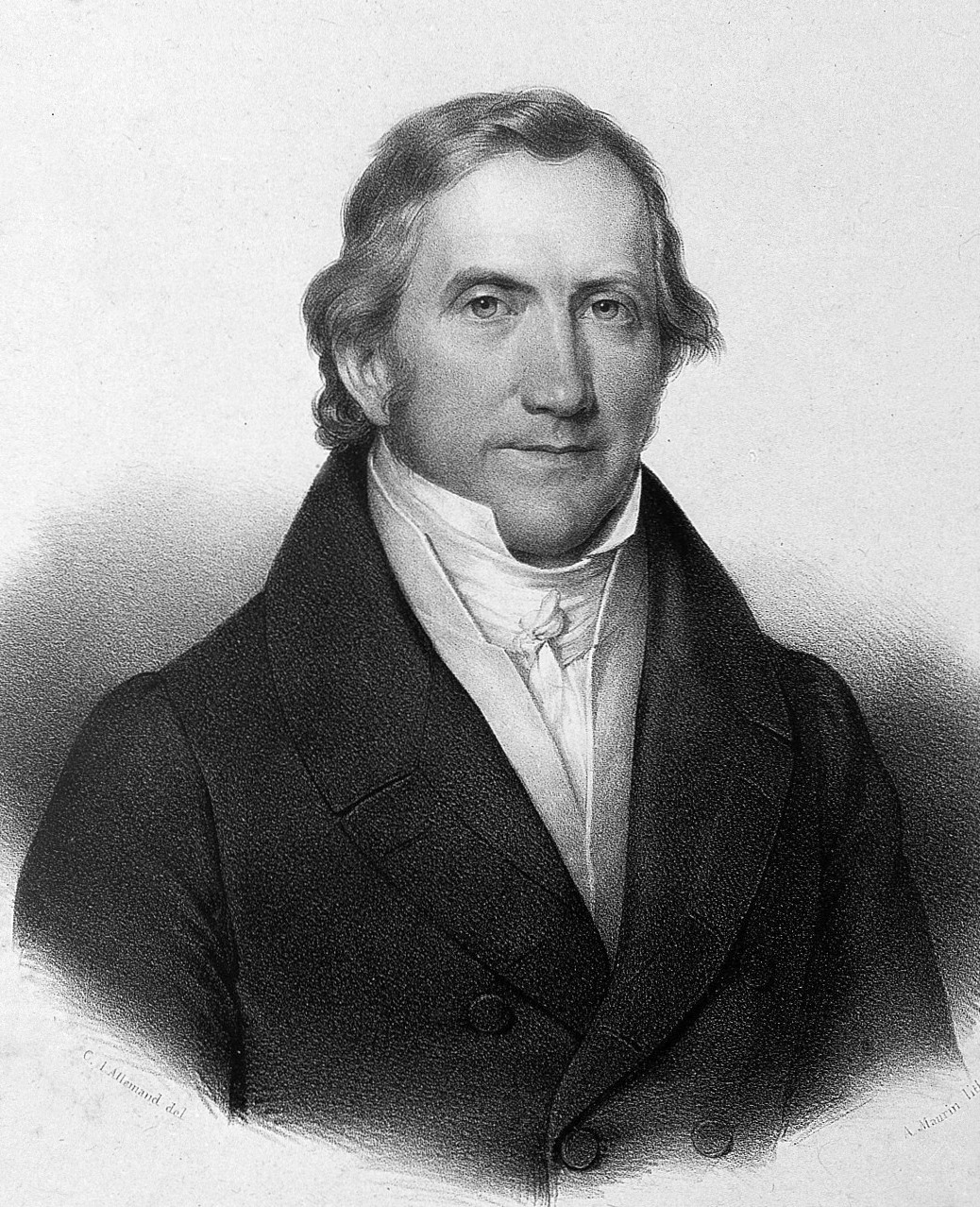
Franz Naegele

Franz Karl Naegele (7 December 1778 – 21 January 1851) was a German obstetrician born in Düsseldorf. His son, Hermann Franz Naegele (1801–1851), was also a noted obstetrician.

He earned his medical degree from the University of Bamberg, afterwards opening a medical practice in Barmen. In 1807, he became an associate professor at the University of Heidelberg, where in 1810 he was appointed a full professor of obstetrics.

He is remembered for "Naegele's rule", a standard method of calculating the due date for a pregnancy. His name is also lent to "Naegele obliquity", also known as an anterior asynclitism.

A variety of obliquely contracted bony pelvis where there is arrested development of one of the sacral alae, has also been named after him (Naegele's pelvis).

== Selected publications ==
- Beytrag zu einer naturgeschichtlichen Darstellung der krankhaften Erscheinung am thierischen Körper, welche man Entzündung nennt, und ihre Folgen. Dänzer, Düsseldorf 1804. Digitalization by the University of Düsseldorf
- Erfahrungen und Abhandlungen aus dem Gebiethe der Krankheiten des weiblichen Geschlechtes. Mannheim: Tobias Loeffler. 1812.
- Nägele, Franz Carl (1822). Über den Mechanismus der Geburt. Heidelberg. Translated into English by Edward Rigby in 1829 as An Essay on the Mechanism of Parturition.
- Das Weibliche Becken: betrachtet in Beziehung auf seine Stellung und die Richtung seiner Höhle: nebst Beyträgen zur Geschichte der Lehre von den Beckenaxen. Karlsruhe: Chr. Fr. Müller. 1825.
- Katechismus der Hebammenkunst: als Anhang zu seinem Lehrbuche der Geburtshülfe für die Hebammen : für Lehrende und Lernende (3rd ed.). Heidelberg: J.C.B. Mohr. 1836.
- Das schräg verengte Becken; nebst einem Anhange über die wichtigsten Fehler des weiblichen Beckens. (1839); translated into English in 1939 as "The obliquely contracted pelvis, containing also an appendix of the most important defects of the female pelvis".
- Lehrbuch der Geburtshülfe (1843) – Textbook of midwifery.
- "Ein Briefwechsel zwischen Joseph Alexis Stoltz und Franz Carl Naegele der XIII.: Versammlung der deutschen Gesellschaft für Gynäkologie 2.-5. Juni 1909 zum Empfang gewidmet von der Universitätsfrauenklinik Straßburg I. Els". J.H. Heitz, 1909 (Letters to and from Joseph-Alexis Stoltz)
