= Labor Inducer (hamburger) =

Hamburger served in Minnesota, US

The Labor Inducer is a hamburger created at The Suburban restaurant in Excelsior, Minnesota, United States. It is notable for a large number of pregnant women claiming to have gone into labor soon after eating it.

== History ==
The burger, consisting of an Angus beef patty, American cheese, honey-cured bacon, peach-caramelized onions, spicy Bavarian mustard, and Cajun rémoulade, all served in a toasted pretzel bun, was first conceived at The Suburban in April 2019 as an entry to a local burger competition. According to the restaurant's co-owner, Kelsey Quarberg, while taste-testing potential entries as sliders while 38 weeks pregnant, she liked what would become the Labor Inducer so much that she ate a full-sized version of it and then gave birth six hours later.

The burger went on to win third place in the People's Choice category at the Twin Cities Burger Battle, after which it was permanently added to the menu at the Suburban. That summer, a customer by the name of Katy Engler went into labor on midnight of the day she ate the burger, which made The Suburban popular with pregnant women after news of the births was shared on its social media.

By 2021, 31 women said that they had gone into labor within 24 hours of eating the burger, including Shelby Prins, a Virginia woman who was brought a disassembled Labor Inducer by her mother and went into labor the morning after reassembling and eating it, giving birth to her son on Labor Day.

The Suburban changed owners in 2023 and was rebranded as MontegoBlu. As of 2026, the restaurant's website says the burger is responsible for "over 100 babies and counting".

== Analysis ==
Quarberg herself has stated she believes the large number of births given after eating the burger is partly due to The Suburban attracting large numbers of pregnant women around their due date. This view is also shared by Jonathan Schaffir of Ohio State University who stated in an interview that "several restaurants — I've seen ads with similar claims in New York and Georgia — promote dishes that they say will trigger labor for expectant moms who are tired of waiting. But the success stories that they circulate are likely the result of women who would have gone into labor anyway at that late date in pregnancy, whether they consumed the pizza, eggplant parmigiana, burger, etc., or not." There is no evidence for the old wives' tale that spicy food, such as the Labor Inducer's sauces, causes women to enter labor.
