= Odon device =

Medical device that assists during a difficult birth

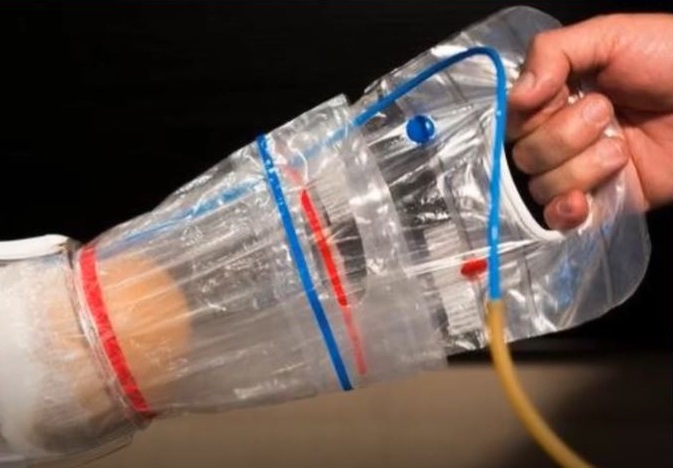
Odon device

The Odón device is a medical device that is designed to assist during a difficult birth. The device consists of a plastic sleeve that is inflated around the baby's head and is used to gently pull and ease the head of the infant through the birth canal.

== Need ==
Worldwide, more than 13 million births each year face serious complications, and every day about 800 people die from preventable causes related to pregnancy and childbirth (about 300,000 annually). The use of forceps and other mechanical devices in the extraction of a baby in a difficult delivery can cause internal bleeding in the mother or may result in injuries to the baby's head or spine.

The World Health Organization has shown its support for the use of Odón device due to potentially to allowing for vaginal delivery in complicated pregnancies in which common medical practice would have led to a cesarean section, stating the device "may be safer and easier to apply than forceps/vacuum extractor for assisted deliveries, and a safe alternative to some caesarean sections in settings with limited access to surgical capacity and human resource constraints." By reducing contact between the baby's skull and the birth canal via suction cups, the risk of infection is also reduced.

== Conception ==
The concept behind the device was developed in 2006 by Jorge Odón, a car mechanic from Lanús, Argentina, who had seen a video describing a method to extract a loose cork from inside an empty wine bottle by inserting a plastic bag into the bottle, inflating the bag once it has enveloped the cork and then pulling out the inflated bag together with the cork; Odón conceived of the use of this same technique that evening in bed and spoke with an obstetrician who encouraged him to move ahead with the idea. The first model of the device was created by sewing a sleeve onto a cloth bag and was tested using a doll inserted into a glass jar to simulate the use of the device in the delivery process.

In complicated deliveries, the device is positioned against the baby's scalp and the lubricated sleeve is gently inserted around the baby's head. Once a marker on the device indicates that it has been properly positioned, the sleeve's inner compartment is inflated, providing a strong grip on the baby's head. The inserter is taken away and the sleeve can be pulled with up to 19 kilograms (42 lb) of force to pull out the head and allow for the delivery of the baby.

== Testing and development ==
After further testing, Odón was introduced to the chief of obstetrics at a hospital in Buenos Aires who saw the benefit of the method and arranged to have the device tested more thoroughly at an Iowa laboratory that has simulators designed to model delivery methods more realistically. Safety testing had been performed on 20 people in Argentina, all of whom had previously given birth and were experiencing uncomplicated pregnancies, including a woman who was able to deliver a baby weighing 9 pounds (4.1 kg) with only two pushes. Further testing will be conducted on more than 250 people in China, India and South Africa, with a mix of pregnant people experiencing normal and complicated labor.

Becton Dickinson agreed to manufacture and distribute the unit and estimated that the Odón device could be constructed for $50 per unit, and it was expected that it could be used by midwives as well as obstetricians who would need minimal training to use the device effectively. The World Health Organization (WHO) offered favorable notices regarding the device, which was recognized for its "potential to save the lives of mothers and newborns at the time of birth". The WHO's Dr. Mario Merialdi called the device "exciting", saying that childbirth is an area that has had little recent progress. Dr. Margaret Chan, Director-General of the WHO, described the device as "a low-cost simplified way to deliver babies, and protect mothers [that] promises to transfer life-saving capacity to rural health posts, which almost never have the facilities and staff to perform a C-section [as] the first simple new tool for assisted delivery since forceps and vacuum extractors were introduced centuries ago."

A 2017 study on a model infant head indicated that the Odon device applied less pressure and traction to the infant's head before failing than some other devices when used correctly, as well as less pressure and torsion by some metrics (more torsion on the neck) when purposely inserted incorrectly around the neck of the infant than other tools.

A single set of tests of the device at Southmead Hospital, Bristol, UK in 2021 during births where an assistive method was deemed to be required allowed 19 of 40 births to be completed with the Odon device alone. In four of the cases in which an additional method was required, manufacturing defects were identified in the devices afterwards. People's qualitative experiences and opinions of the device's use during delivery were also gathered during this study. In all but one case, people had positive reactions to the device.

As of 2023, no comprehensive summaries of efficacy and safety were available.
