= Løvset =

Løvset is a surname. Notable people with the surname include:

- Jørgen Løvset (1896–1981), Norwegian professor of medicine, gynecology, and obstetrics
- Mons Arntsen Løvset (1891–1972), Norwegian businessman, newspaper editor, and politician
