= Chignon (medical term) =

Scalp swelling on a newborn due to birth by vacuum extraction

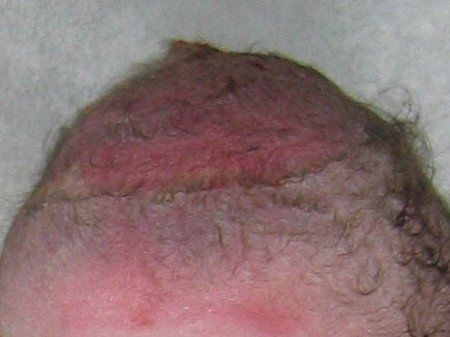
- A baby's scalp showing the effects of a vacuum extraction.
- Specialty: Pediatrics

A chignon (an artificially induced caput succedaneum) is a temporary swelling caused by a build-up of bloody fluid left on an infant's head after they have been delivered by vacuum extraction. A vacuum extraction is a type of assistance used during vaginal delivery by an obstetrician or midwife when the second stage of labor, where the cervix is fully dilated allowing for fetus delivery, is stalled. It anatomically resembles regular caput succedaneum, one of two most frequently occurring birth injuries to the head, the other being cephalohematoma, a usually harmless condition where blood accumulates under the newborn's scalp after vaginal delivery.

During vacuum extraction, the cup is attached to the infant's head, exposing the infant to trauma due to the vacuum pressure and pulling force involved in the procedure. This form of assisted delivery is typically required when the labor is stalled due to difficulties in the stages of labor arising, such as when the infant's head found too high in the birth canal. Due to prolonged pressure and tension, this induces an accumulation of interstitial fluid (the fluid that surrounds cells) as well as possible minor hemorrhages, ultimately resulting in scalp swelling.

A chignon should not be mistaken for bruises or other similar fetal head traumas relating to vacuum extraction. It chignon should begin to resolve within an hour, but it may take between 12 and 18 hours to completely disappear. There are no long-term consequences for the newborn, but as with all birth traumas, it is recommended to be attended to and monitored.

== Cause ==
When the vacuum is applied to the infant's head, the tension creates a difference in pressure between the atmosphere and the infant's scalp that causes the soft tissue layers of the scalp to fill inside the suction cup. Subsequently, interstitial fluid and small hemorrhages build up, causing the head to swell and forming a localized edema. A chignon must be formed when performing a vacuum extraction with a hard plastic or metal cup in order to effectively adhere to the infant's head. This occurs because a hard cup does not spread out over the head like a soft cup. Because it takes a maximum of 2 minutes for a chignon to form, the vacuum extraction should be completed within 15 minutes in order to prevent injury to the baby. A soft cup does not require a chignon to form and is associated with less trauma to the infant, despite a higher risk of cup detachment, which can lead to other injuries, such as lacerations to the scalp.

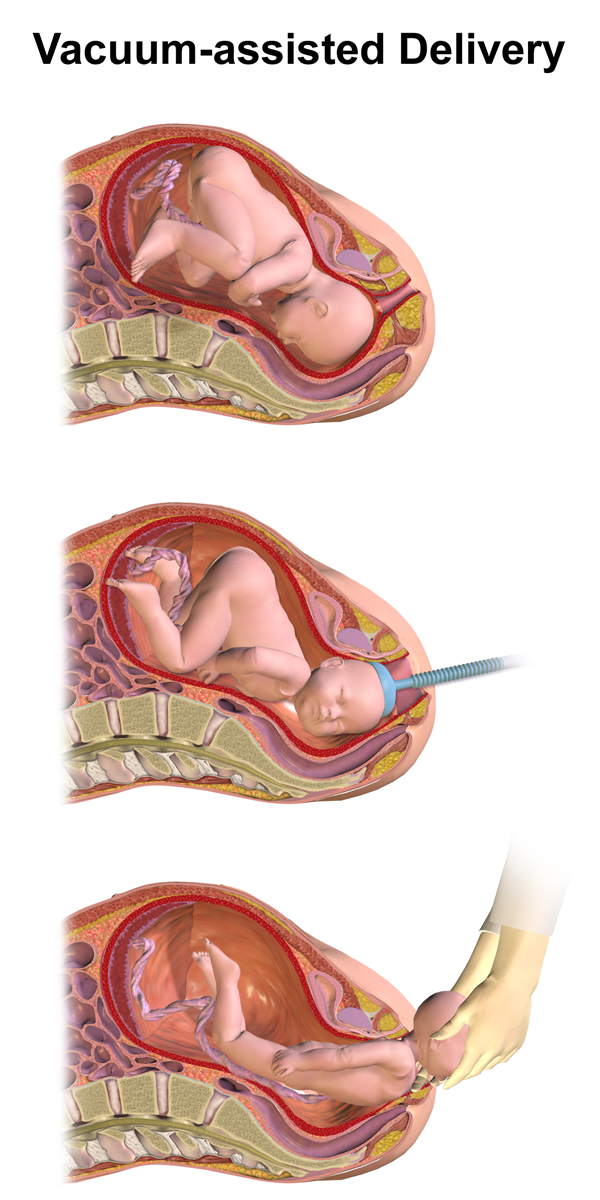
Vacuum extraction of baby.

A chignon is firm and can cross suture lines, and it is often circular in appearance due to the shape of the suction cap. The swelling may shift to each side depending on the position of the infant's head.

== Related head traumas ==
=== Caput succedaneum ===
While a chignon and caput succedaneum are anatomically the same, a chignon is induced by the suction cup used during a vacuum extraction, while a true caput succedaneum is a natural buildup of fluid caused by the pressure induced when the infant's head passes through its mother's cervix. A chignon always involves a buildup of serosanguinous fluid, but a caput succedaneum can involve either serosanguineous or hemorrhagic fluid. Serosanguinous fluid is defined as fluid collected or leaving the body, containing both blood as well as the liquid portion of the blood (serum).

Clinically, a caput succedaneum is soft and uneven, with a depth of about 1 to 2 cm. It can include petechiae, (small, pinpoint red or purple spots due to bleeding), purpura (a purple rash due to blood vessel leakage), and/or a bruised appearance. Like a chignon, a caput succadaneum is usually benign and should resolve within a few days postpartum.

Unlike a chignon, a caput succedaneum can lead to further complications, such as halo scalp ring, a form of hair loss or alopecia. In some cases, a caput succadaneum can cause permanent hair loss or scarring. Finally, jaundice is also a known possible complication of caput succedaneum.

=== Subgaleal hemorrhage ===
Unlike a chignon with no long-term consequences, a subgaleal hemorrhage is a more severe instance of trauma associated with vacuum extraction and forceps delivery, however most commonly caused by vacuum extraction. A subgaleal hemorrhage is introduced into the loose connective tissue found within the subgaleal space, ultimately causing hypovolaemia. Hypovolemia is defined as a state of having a depleted circulating blood volume or fluids in the body. This issue arises when the infant loses about 50-70% of the circulating blood volume, leading to complications such as hypovolemic shock, anemia, and coagulopathy. While subgaleal hemorrhage is a rare complication, it is considered lethal.

Clinical manifestations of a subgaleal hemorrhage are variable; it is recommended that the mean time for diagnosis is typically within 1–6 hours after birth, especially if the infant delivery was through vacuum delivery or prolonged due to complications.Therefore, close monitoring of a newborn infant is prompted with a minimum of eight hour observation for all infants delivered by vacuum extractions or forceps deliveries.A subgaleal hemorrhage may initially look like a caput succedaneum or a chignon because blood crosses the suture lines for all three conditions. However, notifiable signs of a subgaleal hemorrhage include fluctuant scalp swelling, a lesion crossing the suture lines, pitting edema continuing over the head, and fluid wave test.

If a subgaleal hemorrhage is suspected, measures such as hemoglobin count should be performed immediately and monitored every 4-8 hours. Also, imaging for subgaleal hemorrhage such as CT, MRI or radiographs of the skull can be done in order to identify any notifiable fractures. Through early recognition and careful monitoring, hypovolemic shock can be avoided. When any form of assisted delivery devices have been used during labor, the individual(s) caring for the child must be notified that the child must be regularly examined and monitored. By doing so, increasing awareness of chignons and subgaleal hemorrhages will lead to earlier identification, referral and treatment.

=== Cephalohematoma ===
Chignon and cephalohematoma are both relatively common birth injuries which occur to the newborn's head during vacuum delivery. Cephalohematoma and chignon are considered to pose no long-term consequences on a newborn's health.

A cephalohematoma which occurs in 0.4% to 2.5% of live births, is where pressure during vaginal delivery to the fetal head causes blood vessels rupture in the periosteum (a membrane layer covering bone exterior) leading to blood accumulation in the subperiosteal space, a space situated below the periosteum. While the chignon may cross suture lines, cranial sutures (strong tissue that is naturally found connecting the bones of the skull together) are the boundaries for cephalohematoma. As the accumulation of blood into the subperiosteal space is relatively slow, unlike the chignon which immediately occurs upon use of vacuum extraction, cephalohematomas will arise during the first one to three days after birth.

Cephalohematomas more frequently will occur during delivery of infants assigned male at birth compared to infants assigned female at birth, however the reasons are unknown. Some other common factors that can cause cephalohematoma are when using forceps or vacuum-assisted delivery methods, vaginal delivery of large infants, primigravida (the first pregnancy conceived by a pregnant person), when the infant is in a non-ideal position during delivery, and having a prolonged second stage of labor.

Similar to chignon, treatment for cephalohematoma is not required as the body is expected to reabsorb the fluid accumulating in the subperiosteal space. Attempting to drain or aspirate the collected fluid may result in an infection and abscess formation, and is therefore not recommended.

== Optimization of vacuum-assisted delivery ==
Chignons are essentially both normal and harmless byproducts of vacuum-assisted delivery. In practically all cases, chignons disappear on their own within a couple of days postpartum and do not necessitate medical treatment. However, as noted, chignons are not the only side effects induced by vacuum-assisted delivery; therefore, it is still necessary to keep an eye out during the healing process in the event of other possible complications. Prolonged vacuum traction, improper cup placement, and sudden cup detachment are all factors contributing to both maternal and neonatal complications that need to be considered when applying vacuum extraction.

Despite the known risks of vacuum-assisted delivery, it nowadays tends to be a more commonly used birth-assisting tool due to its relatively lower occurrences of both maternal and neonatal complications compared to other methods, such as using forceps or a C-section, which tends to be a last resort option due to risks of significantly greater maternal morbidity. There have also been developed practices to minimize the impact of vacuum-assisted delivery on the neonatal head. Such a method is to use a proper vacuum cup to apply pressure up to 0.8 kg/cm^{2} and rhythmically sync the vacuum with uterine contractions in order to both expedite the delivery process and minimize traction-induced scalpel swelling. The infant's head should be regularly checked throughout the hospital stay.

It is crucial to know when to stop; the longer the delay, the higher the chance of both maternal and neonatal complications developing. All in all, both communicating with and updating healthcare personnel are key; parents and caretakers are encouraged to immediately report any changes or signs of worsening complications.

== See also ==
- Caput succedaneum
- Cephalohematoma
- Subgaleal Haemorrhage
- Vacuum extraction
