= Malpresentation of fetus =

Malpresentation of fetus can refer to:

- Asynclitic birth
- Breech birth
