= Christian Kielland =

Norwegian gynaecologist (1871–1941)

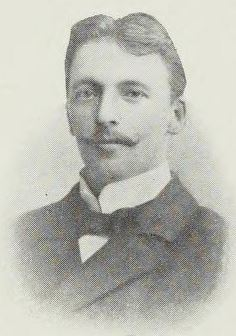
Christian Kielland

Christian Caspar Gabriel Kielland (10 November 1871 in KwaZulu-Natal – 18 March 1941 in Oslo) was a Norwegian gynaecologist, known as the inventor of the Kielland forceps.

The tool is probably the most common forceps used for rotation deliveries. The sliding mechanism at the articulation can be helpful in asynclitic births (when the fetal head is tilted to the side), since the fetal head is no longer in line with the birth canal.

== Early life and education ==
He was born in the Colony of Natal as the son of missionary pastor Jan Olaus Kielland (1833–1898) and Hanna Olsen (1842–1913), and was married in 1900 to Alice Louise Franziska Traub (b. 1875). Kielland came from a shipowner family near Stavanger. In 1874 the family returned to Norway from Africa and Kielland began his studies, first at Oslo Cathedral School where he graduated in 1891. He studied medicine at the Royal Frederick University where he graduated with the medical degree in 1899.

== Career ==
=== Early career ===
After an internship at the hospital in Gravdal, Lofoten, he returned to Oslo in 1901 to work in the department of surgery at the Rikshospitalet. From 1902 to 1904 he worked in the Maternity-Foundation and was obstetrician at the University Clinic (English: Universitetsklinikken). Here he developed a birth rod receiving considerable attention internationally. In the years 1911–1914 he was the so-called senior registrar in Maternity-Foundation. He also worked in Copenhagen and the Catholic hospitals in Oslo.

=== Scientific and clinical research ===
Kielland proposed a new way to correct prolapse-uterus (uterine prolapse), which was well regarded abroad. His international reputation and fame rested yet completely at birth forceps that still bears his name. He started using this tool in 1908 at his practice. He was also a private assistant to Professor Kristian Brandt (1859–1932) in this period.

Over the next seven years he collected data material on 352 cases of birth delivery. Kielland first presented the Kielland forceps in 1908 when he gave a lecture for the Surgical Society in Christiania titled "The Birth Forceps mechanism and technique". Two years later in 1910, he demonstrated his rod in Copenhagen and at various clinics in Germany. But it was not until 1915 during a visit to Munich Gynecological Society at the invitation of Professor Döderlein that his invention got the international recognition it has today. In 1916 Kielland publicized en a complete description of the forceps in a 31-page article in German, complete with user instructions.

Although his new invention was the subject of intense discussion in Norway, it was popular and frequently used abroad. The first year after his invention, the forceps was still not used at his own clinic, The Maternal-Foundation in Oslo. Despite Kielland working closely with Professor Brandt for more than 10 years, his invention never got a definite breakthrough in Norway. On the contrary, Brandt did not think it had any advantage over the one he already used. The Simpsons-forceps met all reasonable demands, he said, "so it has not been necessary to consider any other candidate." He did not think there was much to learn from his former assistant physician.

In a later edition of Brandt's textbook of obstetrics which was published in 1922, seven years after Kielland had first received international attention, the forceps was not even mentioned. Kielland's forceps were, as far as we know, not used in the Birth clinic, or the hospital until after Brandt's departure in 1930.

Kielland was a member in good standing of Norwegian Medical Association.
