= Arthur Joseph Wrigley =

Arthur Joseph Wrigley CBE MD FRCS FRCOG (5 May 1902 – 18 December 1983), known as Joe, was an English obstetrician and gynaecologist after whom the Wrigley forceps are named.

== Family and education ==
Born in Clitheroe, Lancashire, Wrigley was the elder son of the Rev. Canon Joseph Henry Wrigley, Vicar of Clitheroe, and Alice Hyde Bartlett. He was educated at Clitheroe Royal Grammar School and Rossall School before attending St Thomas's Hospital Medical School in London.

In 1930 he married Ann Slater (d 1976), with whom he had one son and one daughter.

== Career ==
Wrigley joined the Department of Obstetrics and Gynaecology at St Thomas's Hospital in 1933 and rose to become head of the department in 1946. He also worked at the General Lying-In Hospital.

He was an examiner in midwifery and women's diseases for several universities and served on the Council of the Royal College of Obstetricians and Gynaecologists. As an adviser to the Ministry of Health from 1953 to 1965, he contributed to the first four Reports on Confidential Enquiries into Maternal Deaths in England and Wales, which helped to improve maternity care and reduce rates of maternal and perinatal mortality.

== Wrigley's forceps ==
In the 1930s a pair of obstetric forceps was discovered in the basement of St Thomas's that were similar to those used by the 18th-century Scottish obstetrician William Smellie. Wrigley asked the instrument-maker Allen & Hanburys to adapt them by shortening the handle and adding a pelvic curve. He advocated the use of shortened forceps and published his findings in The Lancet.

== Recognition ==
Wrigley was a Fellow of both the Royal College of Surgeons of England and the Royal College of Obstetricians and Gynaecologists as well as a liveryman of the Worshipful Society of Apothecaries. He was made a Commander of the Order of the British Empire (CBE) in 1965, shortly before he retired.
