= Jan Palfijn =

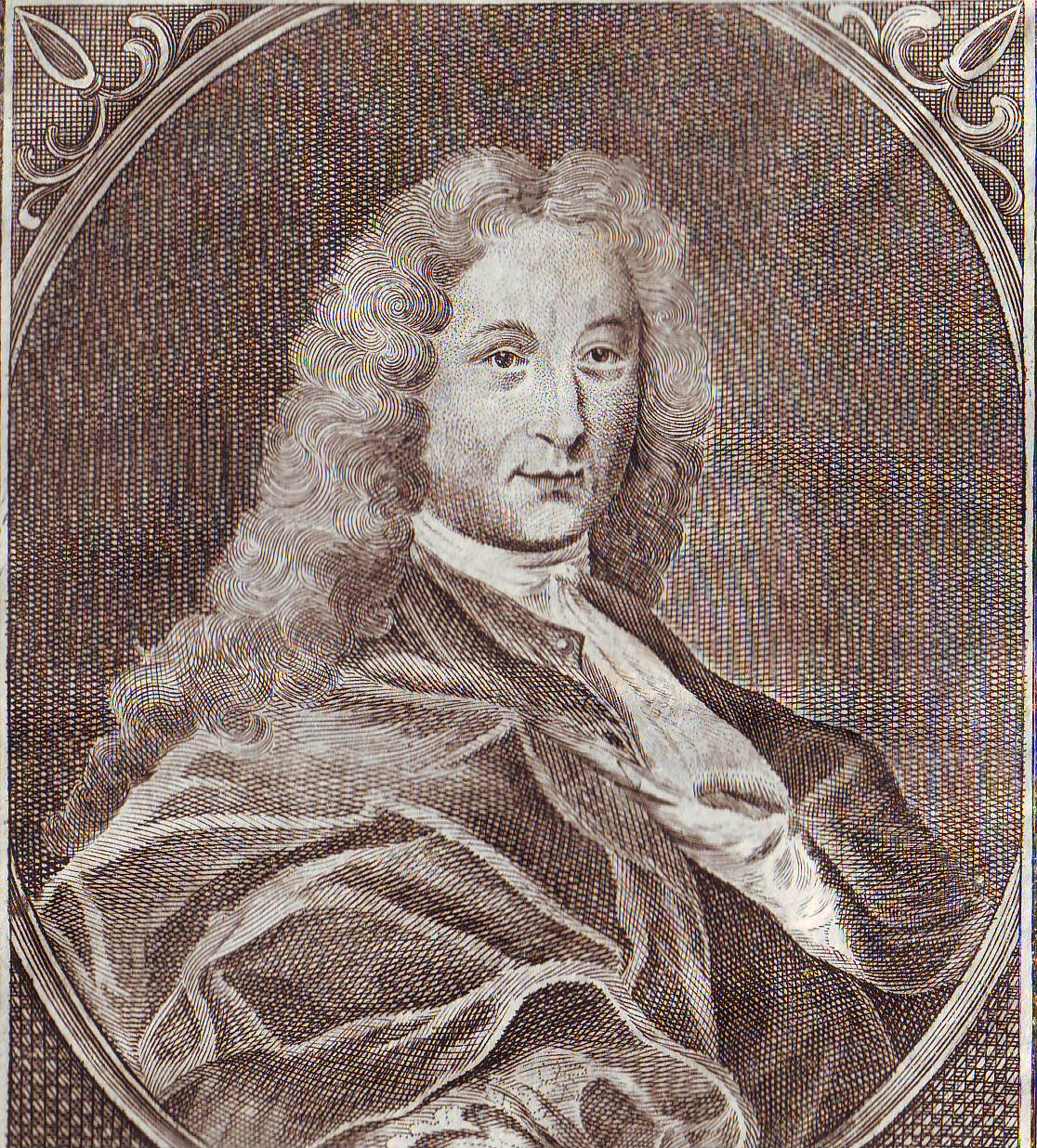
Jan Palfijn, 1758 representation.

Jan Palfijn (name sometimes spelled Jean Palfyn or Jan Palfyn) (28 November 1650 – 21 April 1730) was a Flemish surgeon and obstetrician who was a native of Kortrijk in the County of Flanders at the time of his birth part of the Spanish Netherlands. He practiced medicine in Ypres and Paris, and in 1697 moved to Ghent, where he remained for the rest of his career.

Palfijn is remembered for introducing the obstetrical forceps (Main de Palfijn) into medicine in the early 1720s. Palfijn's forceps initially had a problem because the two separate halves occasionally shifted during use. Later the two halves of the forceps were linked by a hinge to correct the problem.

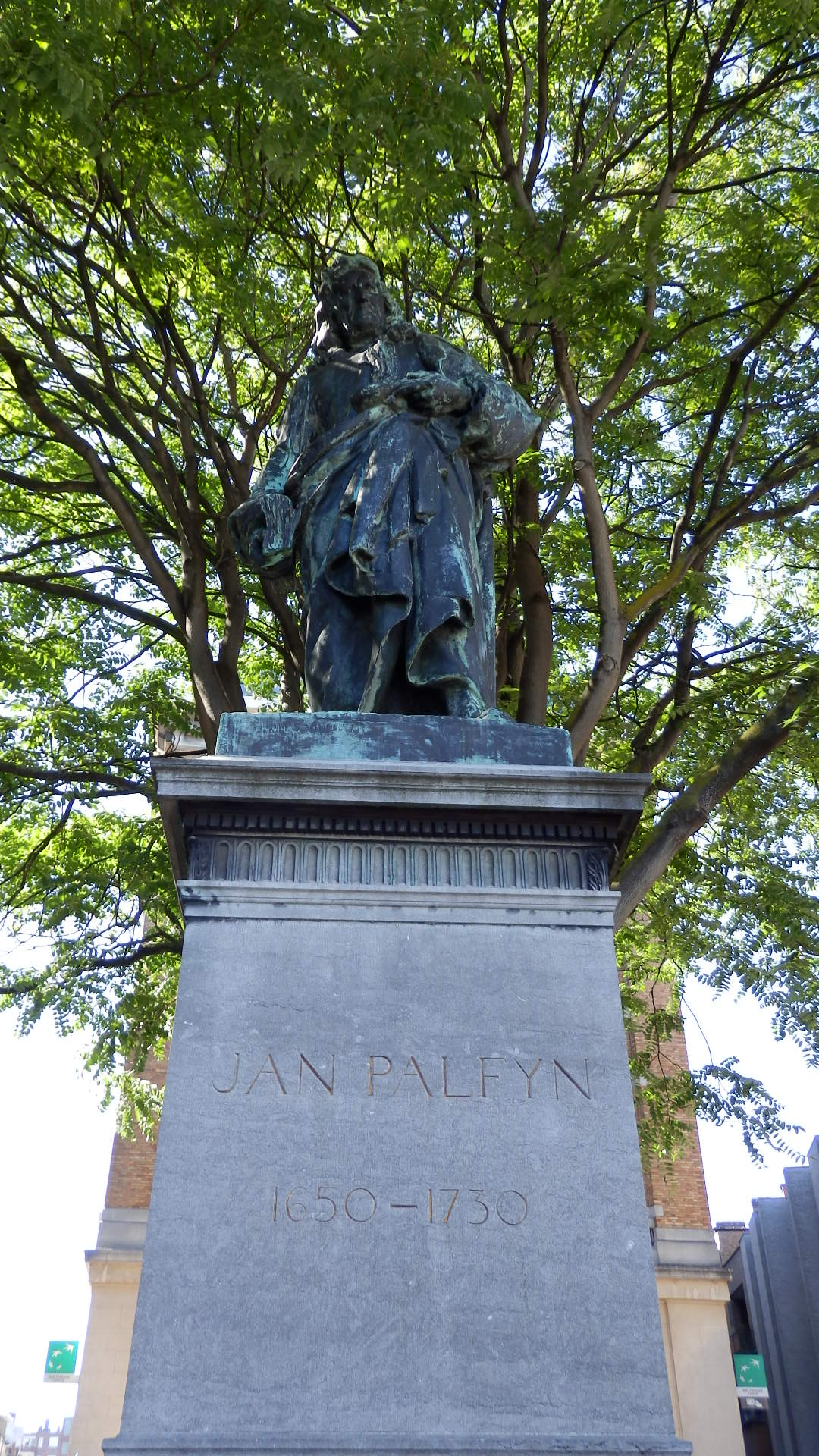
Statue of Jan Palfyn (1650-1730) at Kortrijk (Schouwburgplein), Belgium

In 1718 Palfijn published an influential work for surgeons called l'Anatomie du corps humain (Anatomy of the human body). Reportedly, this book was still in use in Japan in the latter part of the 19th century. The Palfijn Medical Museum, the Jan Palfijn Hospital in Merksem and the Jan Palfijn Hospital in Ghent are named after him.
