= Jørgen Løvset =

Norwegian gynaecologist (1986–1981)

- Born: 4 January 1896; Byneset, Norway
- Died: 15 August 1981 (aged 85); Bergen, Norway
- Title: Professor of medicine
- Spouses: Selma Margaret Nilsen; Aslaug Tordis Gil
- Scientific career
- Fields: Gynecology and Obstetrics
- Institutions: University of Christiania and Maternity clinic in Bergen

Jørgen Løvset (4 January 1896 – 15 August 1981) was a Norwegian professor of medicine, gynecology and obstetrics. He was the son of a farmer Arnt Løvset (1873–1938) and Helle Hove (1870–1911), married Selma Margaret Nilsen (1894–1986) in 1924, divorced 1950, and married again in 1951 with the nurse Aslaug Tordis Gil (1921–1976).

== Education ==
Løvset graduated with examen artium in 1916, then studied medicine at the University of Christiania and was MD in 1924. After some years in private practice and many years as a hospital doctor, he defended dr.med. degree work Somatische Konstitutionszüge und Ihre Beziehungen zur Geburt des Kinder in 1940.

== Career ==
After the candidate service Løvset came to Orkanger as practitioner for four years. He started his hospital career in 1929, and visited several specialized departments before concentrating on obstetrics and gynecology, with education positions at three of the largest Norwegian institutions in the subject: Rikshospitalets Kvinneklinikk in Oslo, Oslo Municipal Kvinneklinikk and the Kvinneklinikken at Haukeland sykehus. In 1931, he returned to Bergen as a registrar at Kvinneklinikken. Løvset was at Haukeland sykehus for almost four years before it went to the education side of Oslo as reserve physician at Women's Clinic, National Hospital from 1936 to 1940. In 1940, he became physician at the Kvinneklinikken, Haukeland sykehus, the same year he defended dr.med. degree. Løvset wrote several books, including a textbook for midwives. The last internationally known law book published was in 1968, a health teaching for pregnant women and mothers and a monograph on vaginal delivery. When the University of Bergen was opened in 1946, Løvset became professor there. In 1950 he encouraged Astrid Kruse Andersen to work at Kvinneklinikken in Bergen to start up with pregnancy and postnatal exercise as they were the first institution in Norway that offered. He was Dean of the Faculty of Medicine at the University of Bergen from 1952 to 1957 and the university's vice rector from 1954 to 1957.

Løvset was one of the pioneers of gynecology and obstetrics, and after Christian Kielland (1871–1941), the best-known Norwegian gynecologist internationally. He constructed new and improved old instruments and developed techniques to safer delivery in difficult situations, especially for fetuses that were born in the breech. He was involved in the changes in obstetrics where it went from being primarily a subject og fetal delivery with emphasis on the mechanics of birth, to be more similar to other medical disciplines. It was possible to bypass the narrow pelvis and birth obstructions by caesarean section, as in sing time as chief of Bergen no longer always a dangerous choice. Still rare, but increasingly became the first choice. Birth Council was to change the character. The technique in difficult vaginal delivery was through the centuries continually enhanced with new manual and instrumental methods. Christian Kielland's birth in 1915, Rod was a Norwegian contributions that were spread around the world. Jørgen Act continued this tradition. He never settled down with the existing methods were good enough. With thorough knowledge of the dynamics of birth and great constructive imagination he made instruments and describe techniques that have been left. His name is known worldwide for a new way to release the child's shoulders at the breech birth (Løvset's manoeuvre), which he published in 1936. The method is described in all textbooks and remains the standard method in Norway at the vaginal birth of children in the breech.

In 1932 Løvset designed an umbilical clamp made of aluminum, complete with seaweed, which later was used for all births in Norway for at least 50 years. Now use a rubber band, which is cheaper, but hardly better. 1933 he made an instrument to the gradual enlargement of the cervix before the abortion, to prevent damage during the procedure. This was used in nearly 40 years, until it was drugs (prostaglandins) that had the same effect.

Løvset did pioneering work in artificial insemination of infertility. In 1939 he started the insemination of donor sperm to women who were married to infertile men. He presented the results of this in an international journal in 1951 and a Norwegian publication, 1952. The author Aksel Sandemose criticized such anonymous insemination in a harsh article in his magazine, Årstidene (the seasons), but Løvset defended his method in 1953.

Many Norwegian gynecologists received special education under Løvsets management at the Kvinneklinikken in Bergen. There are many testimonies from the time of positive influences and the Løvset as set by his calm, determination and skill. He also wrote textbooks on obstetrics and health teaching for pregnant women.

== Honors ==
- Chairman of the Medical Society of Bergen 1947-1949
- Member of the Society for the Advancement of Science in Bergen from 1952
- Dean of the Faculty of Medicine in Bergen 1951-1958
- Guest lecturer at universities in Australia and New Zealand 1958
- Appointed Officer of the 1st of St. Olav in 1967
