= Flexion point =

Attachment point for ventouse cups

In obstetrics, the term flexion point refers to a spot on the fetal head on which the cup of a ventouse should to be placed for extraction of the child to be most effective.

When the cup of the ventouse is applied on the flexion point, the fetal head will remain flexed under traction, hence the name flexion point.

== Location ==
The flexion point is located on the sagittal suture, 3 cm (about 1 inch) forward of the posterior fontanelle.

== Finding the flexion point ==
- Use the middle finger to identify the posterior fontanelle, then move the finger forward along the sagittal suture approximately 3 cm / 1 inch.
- With the finger on the flexion point and palmar surface in a superior direction, note where the back of the finger makes contact with the fourchette (this is used to determine how far the ventouse cup must be inserted).
