= Asynclitic birth =

Position of a fetus in the uterus

In obstetrics, asynclitic birth, or asynclitism, refers to the malposition of the fetal head in the uterus relative to the birth canal. Many babies enter the pelvis in an asynclitic presentation, but in most cases, the issue is corrected during labor. Asynclitic presentation is not the same as shoulder presentation, where the shoulder enters first.

Fetal head asynclitism may affect the progression of labor, increase the need for obstetrical intervention, and be associated with difficult instrumental delivery. The prevalence of asynclitism at transperineal ultrasound was common in nulliparous women (those who have never given birth) at labor stage two and seemed more commonly associated with non occiput anterior position, suggesting an autocorrection typically occurs. When self-correction does not occur, obstetrical intervention is necessary. Persistent asynclitism can cause problems with dystocia, and has often been associated with cesarean births. However, a skilled midwife or obstetrician a complication-free vaginal birth may be achievable through movement and positioning of the mother, and patience and allowing the baby to move through the pelvis and moulding of the skull during the birthing process. Other options include the use of vacuum-assisted delivery and forceps. No evidence suggests that one asynclitic presentation predicts another in subsequent childbirth.

== Diagnosis ==
Asynclitism can be digitally diagnosed using intrapartum ultrasound through the transabdominal cavity and the transperitoneal cavity. Intrapartum ultrasonography is regularly used during pregnancy to constantly monitor the fetal position within the mother's belly. The International Society of Ultrasound in Obstetrics and Gynecology Practice Guidelines recommend the use of intrapartum ultrasound to diagnose asynclitic births during prolonged and obstructed labors.

Asynclitism is most easily diagnosed during labor when the cervix is opened allowing the orientation of the occiput, the back of the fetal head, to be visually assessed in relation to the mother's pelvis. Posterior asynclitism is when the fetal occiput is facing the mother's spine, and anterior asynclitism is when the fetal occiput is facing the mother's belly. The most common and preferred type of asynclitism is the left occiput anterior asynclitism because the baby's head enters the pelvis in such a way that it minimizes the circumference of how the baby exits the body as much as possible. In this type of asynclitism, it allows the fetus to be in the most efficient position. The back of the fetus's head is towards the carrier's left side. Meanwhile, their face is towards the mother's right side at an angle between the hip and the spine of the mother. Posterior asynclitism can lengthen the duration of labor and cause complications. Asynclitism is most commonly discovered during vaginal exams conducted in labor. During the exam, the healthcare professional may feel the parietal bone more distinctly than others. Professionals can also use ultrasound to help identify potential asynclitism.

== Occurrence ==
Asynclitism can occur at any time during pregnancy. It most commonly occurs near the end of the third trimester or during labor, when the fetus becomes more developed and begins moving down the birth canal.

== Causes ==
The exact cause of asynclitism is unknown. The shape and size of the uterus, the weight of the fetus, pelvic anatomy, and multiparity can contribute to it, and the likelihood of asynclitism increases if the mother has rotated hips. Situational factors include a short umbilical cord and unevenness of the pregnant person's pelvic floor during contractions, leading to the baby's head tipping to one side.

Asynclitism can also begin at the time of birth. This happens when the fetus quickly comes down on the pelvic floor before straightening its head when the water breaks. This can be due to the water rushing through the pelvis too quickly and once it occurs, it is difficult to correct.

== Signs and symptoms ==
Signs of asynclitism that may be observed without medical diagnostic equipment include visually asymmetric baby bumps, caused by the baby's head being tilted asymmetrically in relation to the mother's pelvis, or by an abnormal buildup of amniotic fluid. The mother may report symptoms of abdominal discomfort, particularly on one side, or pain on one side of the hips.

== Complications ==
Asynclitism is common as the fetus enters through and tilts the maternal pelvis. There are three types: anterior, posterior, and lateral asynclitism. Minor asynclitism generally resolves itself and results in uncomplicated births. Minor cases present mild molding and the slight deviation of the head from the midline, but are otherwise absent of major fetal head malpositioning. In cases that present with persistent occiput posterior -- in which the head is in a downward position, but facing towards the front of the abdomen -- or shoulder positions, this can result in prolonged and difficult delivery and may warrant surgical intervention.

Complications can occur before, during, and after birth that affect both parent and baby. Asynclitism can lead to slower and more difficult labor, increasing stress and fatigue. If the fetus's head is not optimally positioned, this can result in dystocia, necessitating an operative delivery. Complications are associated with procedures such as operational vaginal deliveries (OVD), particularly with the use of vacuum extraction, and caesarean sections (CS). Caesarean sections can increase the risk of maternal complications, which can affect future pregnancies. These include uterine ruptures, chronic pain, hemorrhages, and bladder injury. One of the more severe complications is placenta accreta, which can lead to a life-threatening hemorrhage and peripartum hysterectomy.

Complications the baby may face include cephalohematomas, hyperbilirubinemia, and intracranial hemorrhages. Asynclitic birth can also increase the risk of birth injuries such as brachial plexus injury, in which the nerves responsible for sending signals to the baby's arm are damaged, resulting in temporary or permanent numbness, weakness, or even paralysis in the affected arm. In rare cases, uncorrected asynclitism can lead to neonatal asphyxia, in which the child does not receive enough oxygen before, during, or just after birth, which can result in temporary or permanent organ damage. The mother may experience complications such as vaginal or cervical tears, excessive blood loss, infection of the placental membrane, and postpartum infections. Asynclitism can also affect the development of facial structures and nerves during pregnancy, with lifelong consequences for the child. These complications can include facial malformation, Bell's palsy, deviated septum, and facial asymmetry.

== Management ==
Various techniques have been tried to resolve an asynclitic position of the fetus. Vacuum extraction, a delivery assistance method used for prolonged or obstructed labor, has been shown to reverse the position from the less optimal one, known as occiput posterior or occiput transverse, to the more favorable position known as occiput anterior. However, it is not the primary treatment for asynclitic births, as the effectiveness rate is not very high and vacuum extraction can lead to additional complications. Possible complications include fetal morbidity and fatality, and damage to the derma layer leading to bleeding within the brain and the layer of skin on the skull, known as cephalohematomas. Facial nerve damage and immobility are permanent consequences from intracranial hemorrhage, leading to a diminished quality of life. However, when it is successful, vacuum extraction can change the position from a non-occital anterior position to an occital anterior position, which is more favorable in terms of asynclitic births. Following any medical procedure to alter the occiput position or any assisted vaginal delivery, monitoring of the neonate is extremely important as intracranial hemorrhages may be imperceptible.

Non-invasive techniques are typically the first steps when dealing with asynclitic birth. Short and quick breaths synchronized with contractions are commonly suggested by the obstetrician to help with prolonged labor with asynclitism. Positioning techniques can also employed to help the baby to rotate or descend. Examples of these techniques include the hands-on-knees position, lunging, kneeling lunge, side-lying release, and use of a birth ball. If positioning techniques do not work, healthcare professionals may attempt manual rotation, attempting to adjust the baby's position manually via the vagina. If none of these methods are successful, the physician may consider a caesarean section to deliver the baby safely.

Along with procedural interventions, there are supportive measures that are taken to alleviate the physical and psychological trauma associated with childbirth. Supportive measures come in both non-pharmacological and pharmacological forms. For pain management, labor analgesia has been shown to be effective. Depending on the procedure, different types of anesthesia, such as pudendal block anesthesia, may be used.

== See also ==
- Naegele obliquity
