= Naegele obliquity =

Position of the fetus in childbirth

Nägele's obliquity is the presentation of the anterior parietal bone to the birth canal during vaginal delivery with the biparietal diameter being oblique to the brim of the pelvis. The synonym for this presentation is anterior asynclitism. It was first described in 1777 by German Karl Nägele.
