= Subgaleal hemorrhage =

Bleeding between the skull and fibrous tissue enclosing it

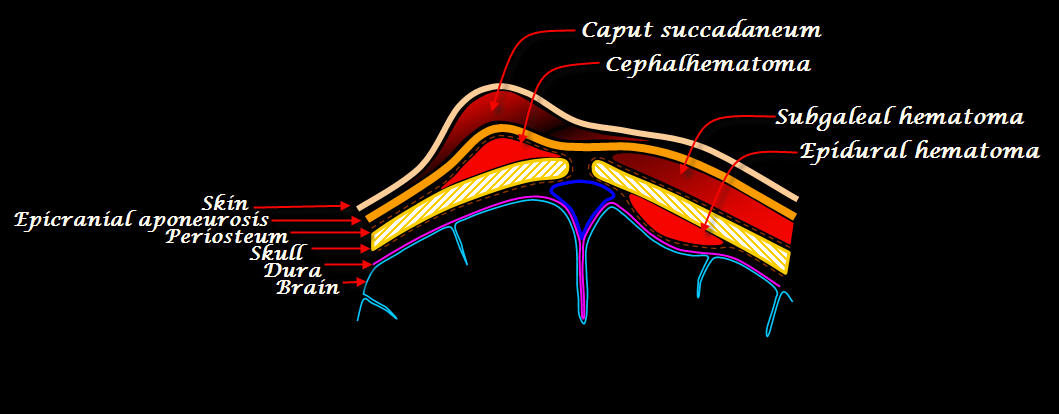
- Newborn scalp bleeds
- Specialty: Pediatrics

Subgaleal hemorrhage, also known as subgaleal hematoma, is bleeding in the potential space between the skull periosteum and the scalp galea aponeurosis (dense fibrous tissue surrounding the skull).

== Symptoms ==
The diagnosis is generally clinical, with a fluctuant boggy mass developing over the scalp (especially over the occiput) with superficial skin bruising. The swelling develops gradually 12–72 hours after delivery, although it may be noted immediately after delivery in severe cases. Subgaleal hematoma growth is insidious, as it spreads across the whole calvaria and may not be recognized for hours to days. If enough blood accumulates, a visible fluid wave may be seen. Patients may develop periorbital ecchymosis ("raccoon eyes").

Patients with subgaleal hematoma may present with hemorrhagic shock given the volume of blood that can be lost into the potential space between the skull periosteum and the scalp galea aponeurosis, which has been found to be as high as 20-40% of the neonatal blood volume in some studies. The swelling may obscure the fontanel and cross cranial suture lines, distinguishing it from cephalohematoma, in which the bleed is confined by its subperiosteal location.

Patients with subgaleal hemorrhage may also have significant hyperbilirubinemia due to resorption of hemolyzed blood. Laboratory studies may demonstrate reduced hemoglobin and hematocrit due to blood loss into the subgaleal space, and coagulation studies may reflect an underlying coagulopathy. Mortality has been reported to occur in 12-14% of cases, generally as a consequence of massive blood loss presenting with shock, often in the setting of uncorrected coagulopathy. However, with early identification and prompt treatment, the prognosis is good, and there are usually no long-term consequences.

== Causes ==
The majority of neonatal cases (90%) result from applying a vacuum to the head at delivery (ventouse-assisted delivery). The vacuum assist ruptures the emissary veins (i.e., connections between dural sinus and scalp veins) leading to accumulation of blood under the aponeurosis of the scalp muscle and superficial to the periosteum.

Additionally, subgaleal hematoma has a high frequency of occurrence of associated head trauma (40%), such as intracranial hemorrhage or skull fracture. The occurrence of these features does not correlate significantly with the severity of subgaleal hemorrhage.

== Diagnosis ==
Early recognition of this injury is crucial for survival. Infants who have experienced a difficult operative delivery or are suspected to have a SGH require ongoing monitoring including frequent vital signs (minimally every hour), and serial measurements of hematocrits and their occipital frontal circumference, which increases 1 cm with each 40 mL of blood deposited into the subgaleal space. Head imaging, using either CT or MRI, can be useful for differentiating subgaleal hemorrhage from other sources of cranial bleeding. Head ultrasound is useful for the diagnosis of SGH in the hands of an operator experienced in imaging the neonatal head and scalp, and is preferable to CT due to lack of ionizing radiation. Coagulation studies are required to detect coagulopathy that may be associated with the bleeding.

== Management ==
Management consists of vigilant observation over days to detect progression and, if required, manage complications (e.g. hemorrhagic shock, unconjugated hyperbilirubinemia and jaundice from hemolyzed red blood cells). The subgaleal space is capable of holding up to 40% of a newborn baby's blood and can therefore result in acute shock and death. Fluid bolus may be required if blood loss is significant and the patient becomes tachycardic. Transfusion and phototherapy may be necessary. Investigation for coagulopathy may be indicated.

== See also ==
- Caput succedaneum
- Cephal
- Cephalohematoma
- Hematoma
- Raccoon eyes
