= Cephalohematoma =

Bleeding between the skull and the periosteum tissue

- Other names: Cephalhematoma
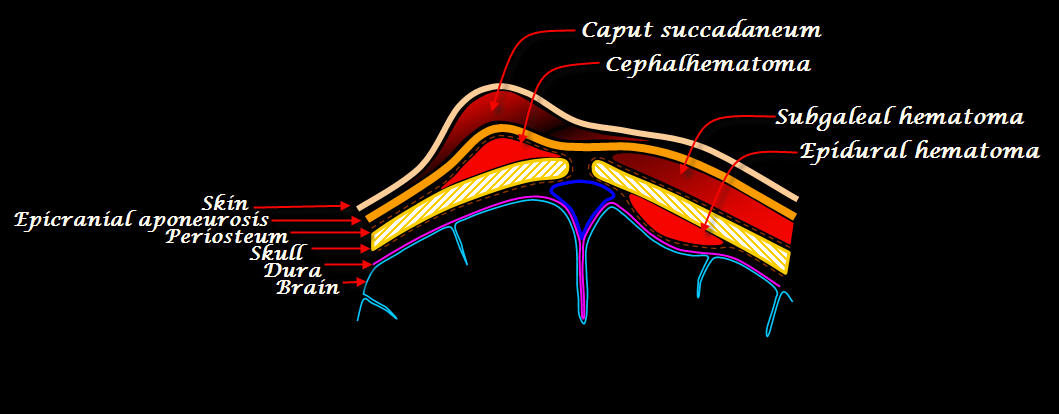
- Newborn scalp haematomata
- Specialty: Pediatrics

A cephalohematoma (American English), also spelled cephalohaematoma (British English), is a hemorrhage of blood between the skull and the periosteum at any age, including a newborn baby secondary to rupture of blood vessels crossing the periosteum. Because the swelling is subperiosteal, its boundaries are limited by the individual bones, in contrast to a caput succedaneum.

== Symptoms and signs ==
Swelling appears 2-3 days after birth. If severe the child may develop jaundice, anemia or hypotension. In some cases it may be an indication of a linear skull fracture or be at risk of an infection leading to osteomyelitis or meningitis. The swelling of a cephalohematoma takes weeks to resolve as the blood clot is slowly absorbed from the periphery towards the centre. In time the swelling hardens (calcification) leaving a relatively softer centre so that it appears as a 'depressed fracture'. Cephalohematoma should be distinguished from another scalp bleeding called subgaleal hemorrhage (also called subaponeurotic hemorrhage), which is blood between the scalp and skull bone (above the periosteum) and is more extensive. It is more prone to complications, especially anemia and bruising.

== Causes ==
The usual causes of a cephalohematoma are a prolonged second stage of labor or instrumental delivery, including ventouse (vacuum) or forceps delivery. Vitamin C deficiency has been reported to possibly be associated with development of cephalhematomas.

== Management ==
Skull x-ray or CT scanning is used if neurological symptoms appear. These measurements are also used if concomitant depressed skull fracture is a possibility. Usual management is mainly observation. Phototherapy may be necessary if blood accumulation is significant leading to jaundice. Rarely, anaemia can develop needing blood transfusion. The presence of a bleeding disorder should be considered but is rare.

Cephalohematomas typically resolve spontaneously within weeks or months of birth, however calcification can occur in 3-5% of cases. While aspiration to remove accumulated blood and prevent calcification has generally been recommended against due to risk of infection, modern surgical standards and antibiotics may make this concern unfounded, and needle aspiration can be considered a safe intervention for significantly-sized cephalohematomas that do not resolve spontaneously after one month.

== See also ==
- Caput succedaneum
- Cephal
- Chignon
- Hematoma
- Subgaleal hemorrhage
