= Vacuum extraction =

Method to assist the delivery of a baby

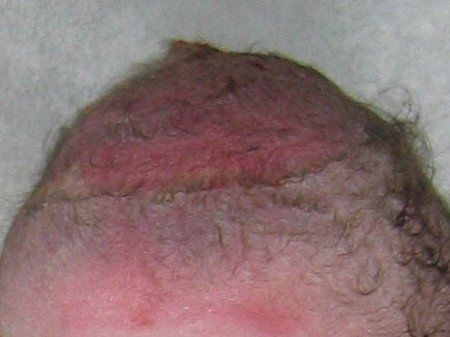
- A baby's scalp showing the effects of a vacuum extraction (chignon). The effects were gone a week later.
- Other names: Ventouse, vacuum-assisted vaginal delivery
- ICD-9-CM: 72.7

Vacuum extraction (VE), also known as ventouse (French for suction cup), is a method to assist delivery of a baby using a vacuum device. It is used in the second stage of labor if that stage has not progressed adequately. It may be an alternative to a forceps delivery or caesarean section. It cannot be used when the baby is in the breech position or for a premature birth. The use of VE is generally safe, but it can occasionally have negative effects on either the mother or the child.

== Medical uses ==
There are several indications to use a vacuum extraction to aid delivery:

- Maternal exhaustion
- Prolonged second stage of labor
- Foetal distress in the second stage of labor, generally indicated by changes in the foetal heart-rate (usually measured on a CTG)
- Maternal illness where prolonged "bearing down" or pushing efforts would be risky (e.g., cardiac conditions, blood pressure, aneurysm, glaucoma). If these conditions are known about before the birth, or are severe, then an elective caesarean section may be performed.

== Technique ==
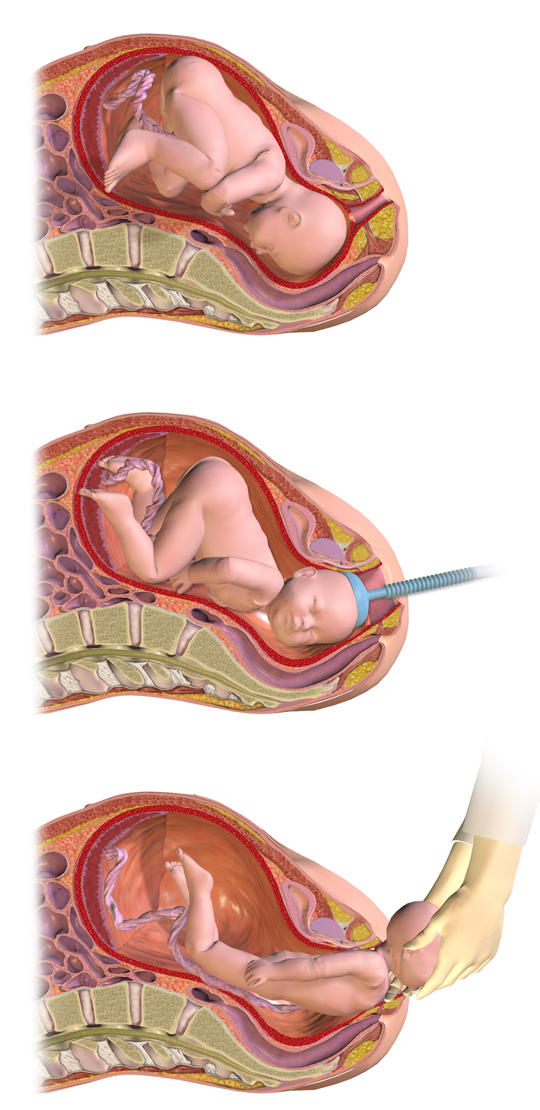
Vacuum-assisted delivery

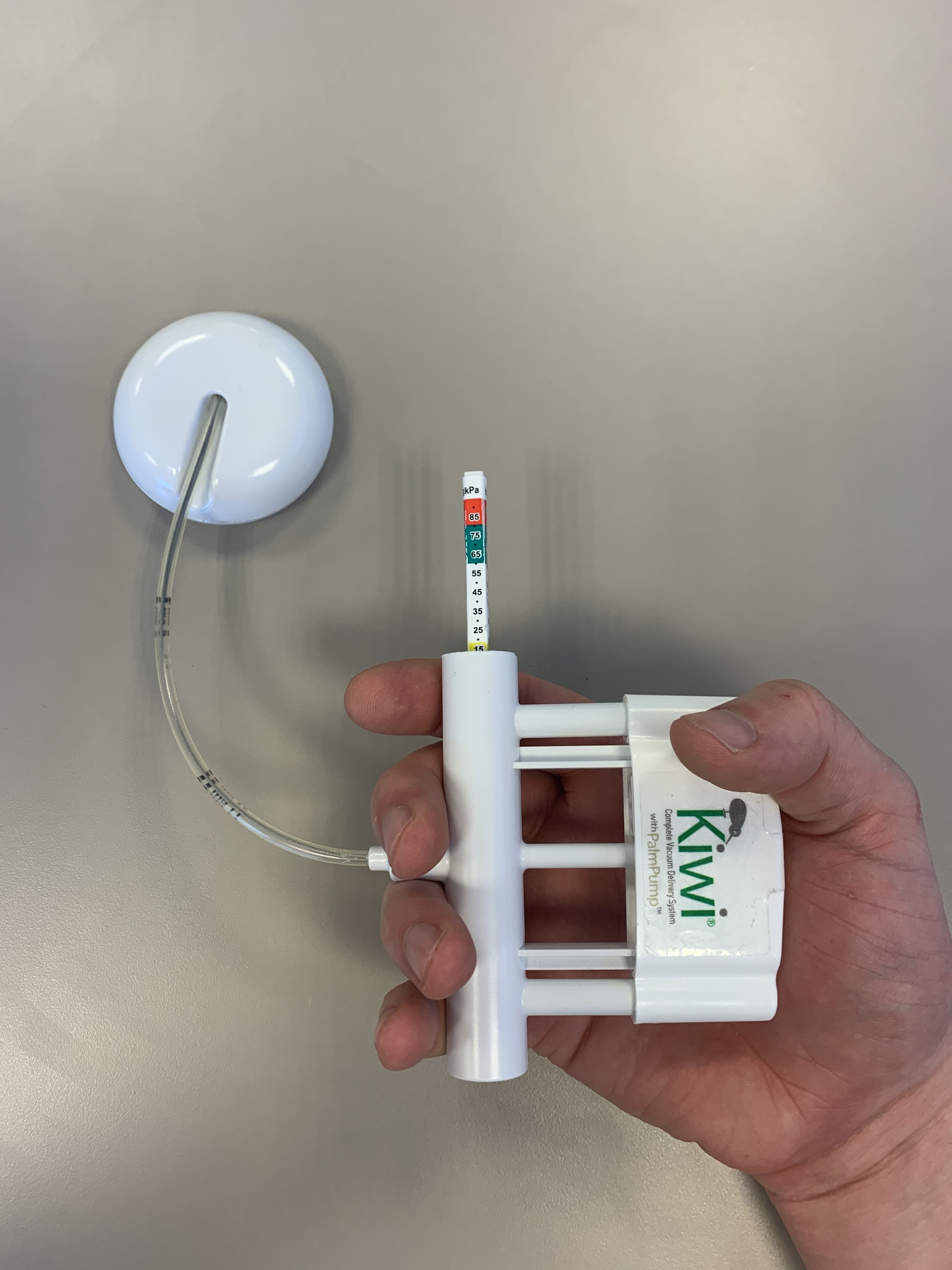
Kiwi vacuum extractor

The woman is placed in the lithotomy position and assists throughout the process by pushing. A suction cup is placed onto the head of the baby, and the suction draws the skin from the scalp into the cup. Correct placement of the cup directly over the flexion point, about 3 cm anterior from the occipital (posterior) fontanelle, is critical to the success of a vacuum extraction. Ventouse devices have handles to allow for traction. When the baby's head is delivered, the device is detached, allowing the birthing attendant and the mother to complete the delivery of the baby.

For proper use of the ventouse, the maternal cervix has to be fully dilated, the head engaged in the birth canal, and the head position known. Preferably, the operator of the vacuum extractor needs to be experienced in order to safely perform the procedure. The baby should not be preterm, previously exposed to scalp sampling, or failed forceps delivery. If the ventouse attempt fails, it may be necessary to deliver the infant by forceps or caesarean section.

== History ==
In 1849 the Edinburgh professor of obstetrics James Young Simpson, subsequently known for pioneering the use of chloroform in childbirth, designed the Air Tractor which consisted of a metal syringe attached to a soft rubber cup. This was the earliest known vacuum extractor to assist childbirth but it did not become popular. Swedish professor Tage Malmström developed the ventouse, or Malmström extractor, in the 1950s. Originally made with a metal cap, new materials such as plastics and siliconised rubber have improved the design so that it is now used more than forceps.

Vacuum delivery as a percentage of vaginal births vary depending on location. In the USA they comprise about 10% to 15% of vaginal births while in Italy 4.8% of vaginal births were delivered via vacuum in 2013.

== Comparisons to other forms of assisted delivery ==
=== Positive aspects ===
- An episiotomy may not be required.
- The mother still takes an active role in the birth.
- No special anesthesia is required.
- There is less potential for maternal trauma compared to forceps and caesarean section.

=== Negative aspects ===
- The baby will be left with a temporary lump on its head, known as a chignon.
- There is a possibility of cephalohematoma formation, or subgaleal hemorrhage which can be life-threatening.
- There is a higher risk of failure to deliver the baby than with forceps, and an increased likelihood of perineal trauma.

== See also ==
- Odón device
