= Obstetrical forceps =

Medical instrument used for the delivery of a baby

Forceps in childbirth
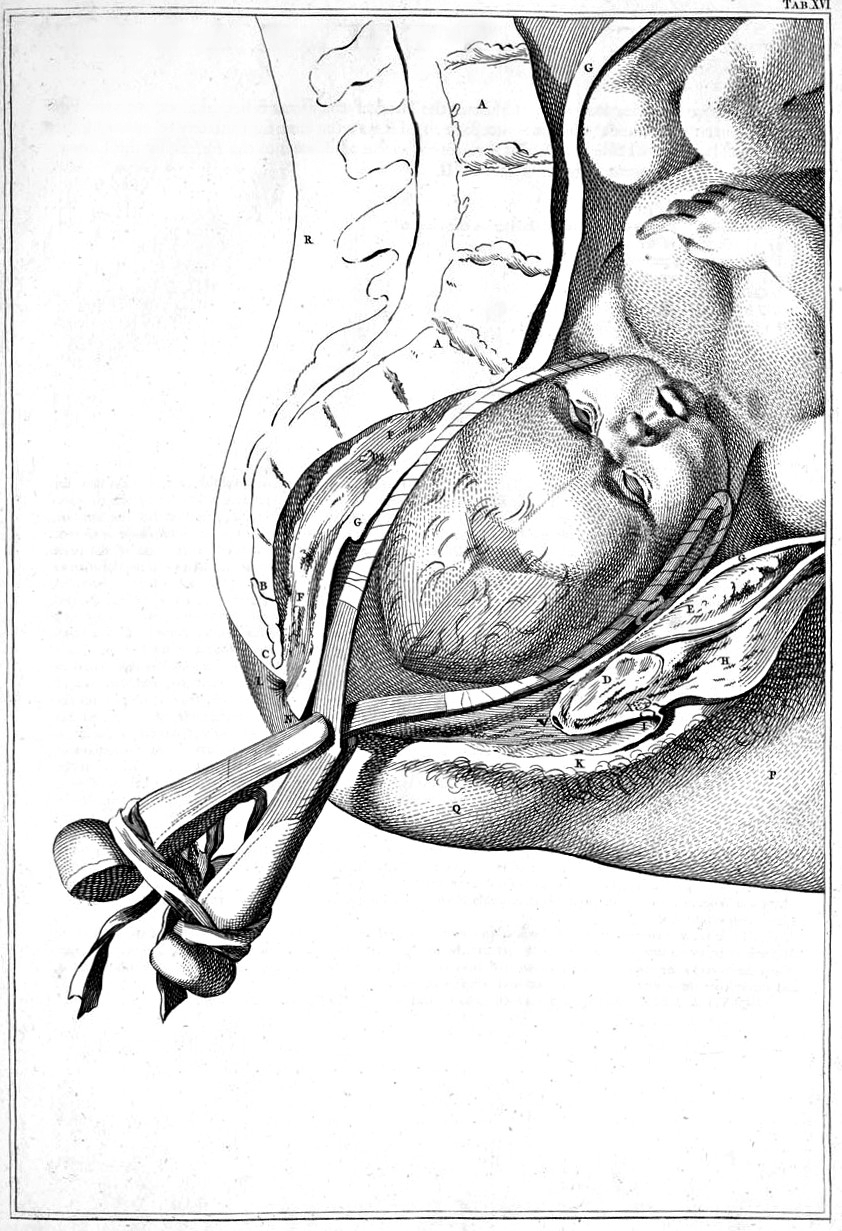
- Drawing of childbirth with use of forceps by Smellie
- ICD-9-CM: 72.0-72.4

Obstetrical forceps are a medical instrument used in childbirth. Their use can serve as an alternative to the ventouse (vacuum extraction) method.

== Medical uses ==
Forceps births, like all assisted births, should be undertaken only to help promote the health of the mother or baby. In general, a forceps birth is likely to be safer for both the mother and baby than the alternatives – either a ventouse birth or a caesarean section – although caveats such as operator skill apply.

Advantages of forceps use include avoidance of caesarean section (and the short and long-term complications that accompany this), reduction of delivery time, and general applicability with cephalic presentation (head presentation). Common complications include the possibility of bruising the baby and causing more severe vaginal tears (perineal laceration) than would otherwise be the case. Severe and rare complications (occurring less frequently than 1 in 200) include nerve damage, Descemet's membrane rupture, skull fractures, and cervical spinal cord injury.

- Maternal factors for use of forceps:
1. Maternal exhaustion.
2. Prolonged second stage of labour.
3. Maternal illness such as heart disease, hypertension, glaucoma, aneurysm, or other conditions that make pushing difficult or dangerous.
4. Hemorrhaging.
5. Analgesic drug-related inhibition of maternal effort (especially with epidural/spinal anaesthesia).
- Fetal factors for use of forceps:
1. Non-reassuring fetal heart tracing.
2. Fetal distress.
3. After-coming head in breech delivery.

== Complications ==
=== Baby ===
- Cuts and bruises.
- Increased risk of facial nerve injury (usually temporary).
- Increased risk of clavicle fracture (rare).
- Increased risk of intracranial hemorrhage - sometimes leading to death: 4/10,000.
- Increased risk of damage to cranial nerve VI, resulting in strabismus.

=== Mother ===
- Increased risk of perineal lacerations, pelvic organ prolapse, and incontinence.
- Increased risk of injury to vagina and cervix.
- Increased postnatal recovery time and pain.
- Increased difficulty evacuating during recovery time.

== Structure ==
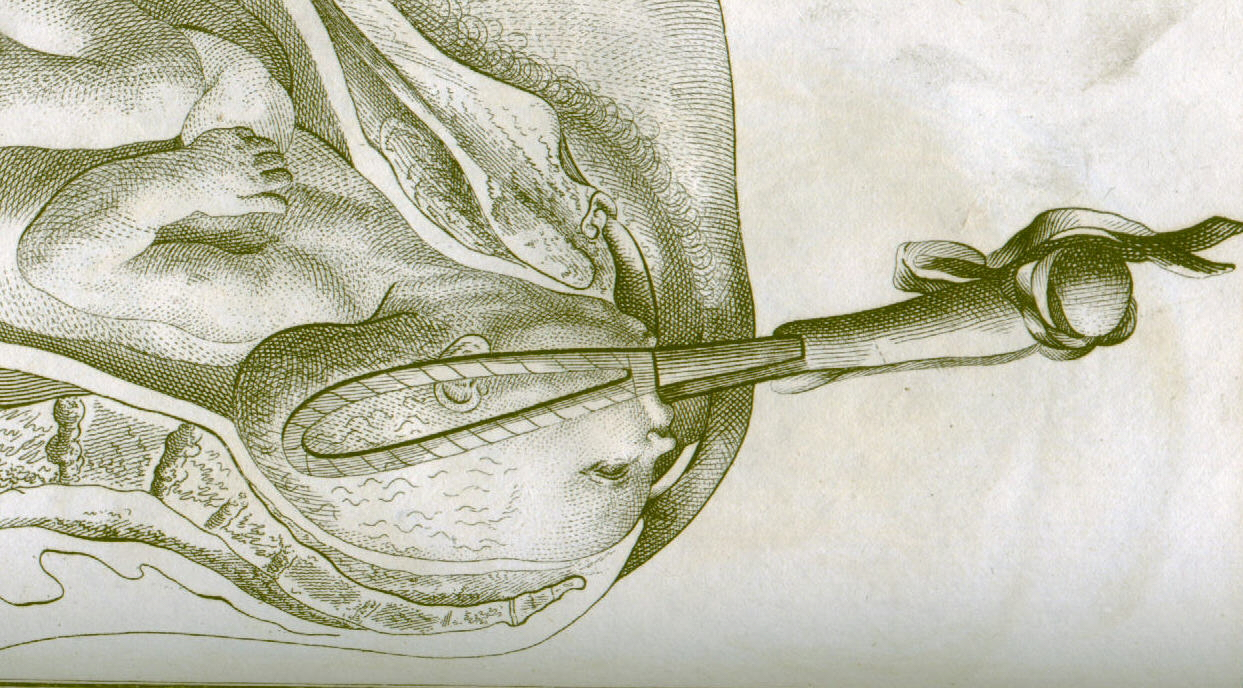
Obstetrical forceps, by William Smellie (1792)

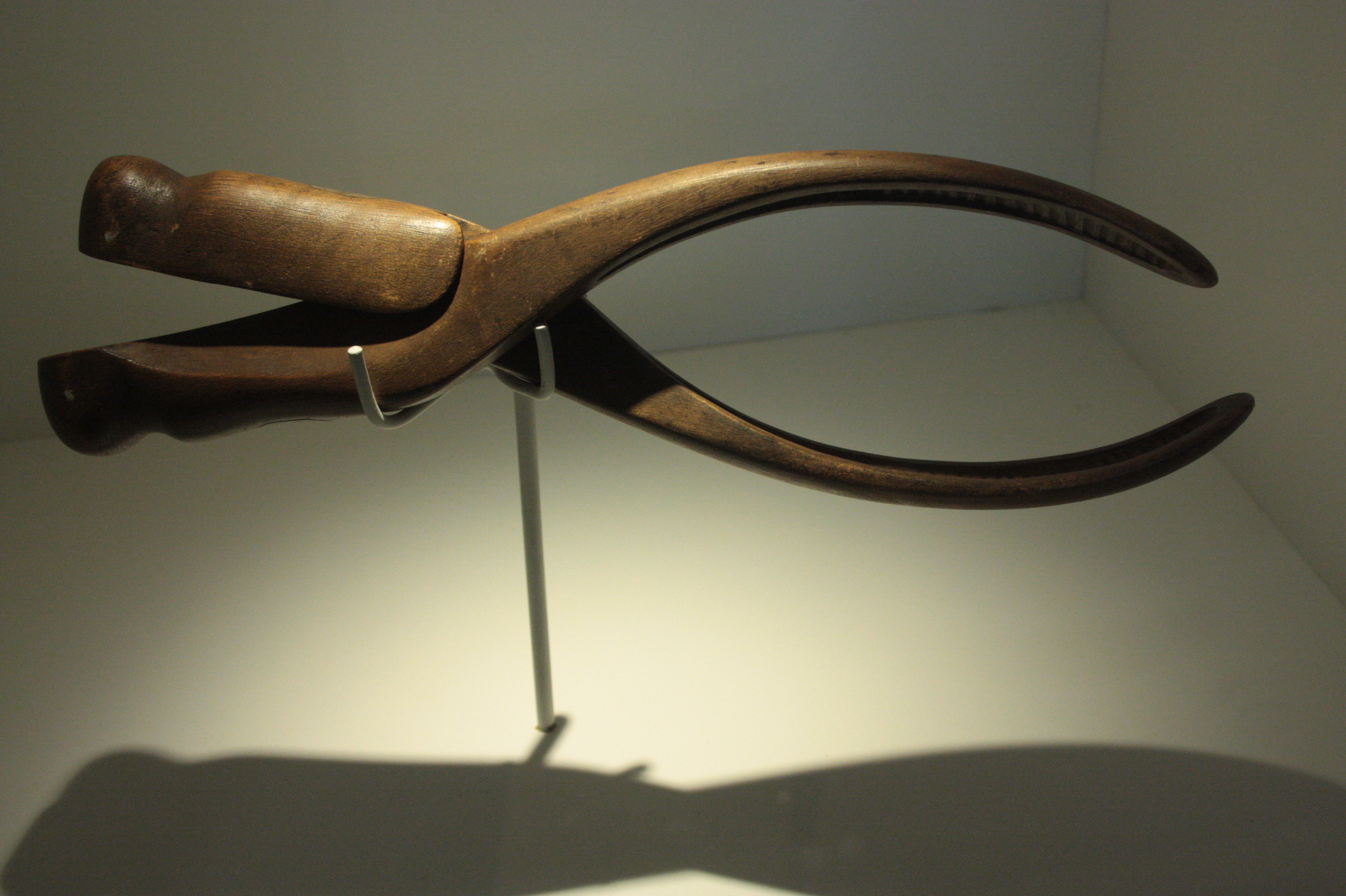
Wooden forceps c.1800, Hunterian Museum, Glasgow

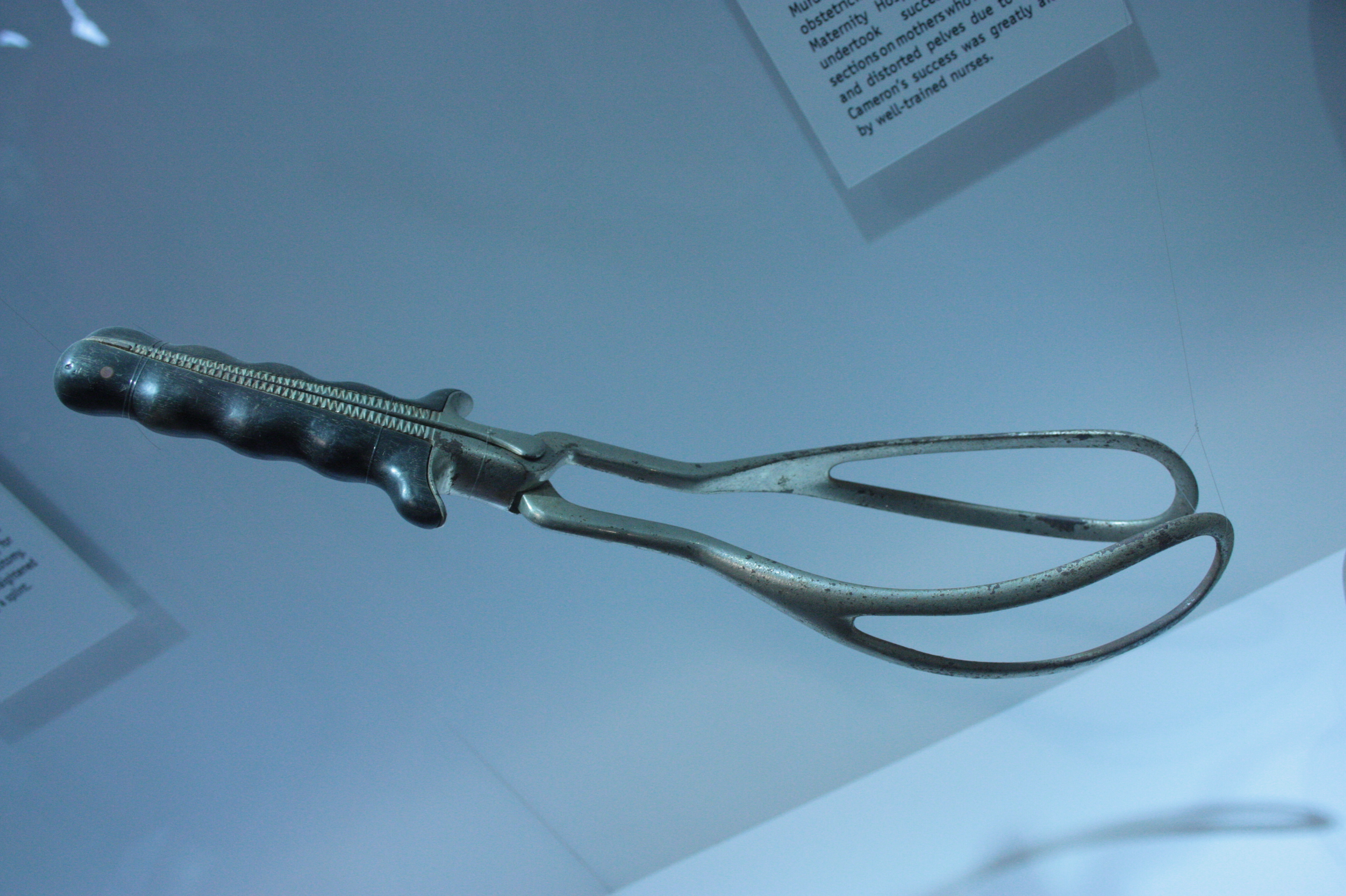
James Young Simpson's Caesarian forceps, Hunterian Museum, Glasgow

Obstetric forceps consist of two branches (blades) that are positioned around the head of the fetus. These branches are defined as left and right depending on which side of the mother's pelvis they will be applied. The branches usually, but not always, cross at a midpoint, which is called the articulation. Most forceps have a locking mechanism at the articulation, but a few have a sliding mechanism instead that allows the two branches to slide along each other. Forceps with a fixed lock mechanism are used for deliveries where little or no rotation is required, as when the fetal head is in line with the mother's pelvis. Forceps with a sliding lock mechanism are used for deliveries requiring more rotation.

The blade of each forceps branch is the curved portion that is used to grasp the fetal head. The forceps should surround the fetal head firmly, but not tightly. The blade characteristically has two curves, the cephalic and the pelvic curves. The cephalic curve is shaped to conform to the fetal head. The cephalic curve can be rounded or rather elongated depending on the shape of the fetal head. The pelvic curve is shaped to conform to the birth canal and helps direct the force of the traction under the pubic bone. Forceps used for rotation of the fetal head should have almost no pelvic curve.

The handles are connected to the blades by shanks of variable lengths. Forceps with longer shanks are used if rotation is being considered.

=== Anglo-American types ===
All American forceps are derived from French forceps (long forceps) or English forceps (short forceps). Short forceps are applied on the fetal head already descended significantly in the maternal pelvis (i.e., proximal to the vagina). Long forceps are able to reach a fetal head still in the middle or even in the upper part of the maternal pelvis. At present practice, it is uncommon to use forceps to access a fetal head in the upper pelvis. So, short forceps are preferred in the UK and USA. Long forceps are still in use elsewhere.

Simpson forceps (1848) are the most commonly used among the types of forceps and has an elongated cephalic curve. These are used when there is substantial molding, that is, temporary elongation of the fetal head as it moves through the birth canal.

Elliot forceps (1860) are similar to Simpson forceps but with an adjustable pin in the end of the handles which can be drawn out as a means of regulating the lateral pressure on the handles when the instrument is positioned for use. They are used most often with women who have had at least one previous vaginal delivery because the muscles and ligaments of the birth canal provide less resistance during second and subsequent deliveries. In these cases, the fetal head may remain rounder.

Kielland forceps (1915, Norwegian) are distinguished by having no angle between the shanks and the blades and a sliding lock. The pelvic curve of the blades is identical to all other forceps. The common misperception that there is no pelvic curve has become so entrenched in the obstetric literature that it may never be able to be overcome, but it can be proved by holding a blade of Kielland's against any other forceps of one's choice. Kielland forceps are probably the most common forceps used for rotation. The sliding mechanism at the articulation can be helpful in asynclitic births (when the fetal head is tilted to the side) since it is no longer in line with the birth canal. Because the handles, shanks, and blades are all in the same plane the forceps can be applied in any position to affect rotation. Because the shanks and handles are not angled, the forceps cannot be applied to a high station as readily as those with the angle since the shanks impinge on the perineum.

Wrigley's forceps, named after Arthur Joseph Wrigley, are used in low or outlet deliveries (see explanations below), when the maximum diameter is about 2.5 cm (0.98 in) above the vulva. Wrigley's forceps were designed for use by general practitioner obstetricians, having the safety feature of an inability to reach high into the pelvis. Obstetricians now use these forceps most commonly in cesarean section delivery where manual traction is proving difficult. The short length results in a lower chance of uterine rupture.

Piper's forceps has a perineal curve to allow application to the after-coming head in breech delivery.

== Technique ==
The cervix must be fully dilated and retracted and the membranes ruptured. The urinary bladder should be empty, perhaps with the use of a catheter. High forceps are never indicated in the modern era. Mid forceps can occasionally be indicated but require operator skill and caution. The station of the head must be at the level of the ischial spines. The woman is placed on her back, usually with the aid of stirrups or assistants to support her legs. A regional anaesthetic (usually either a spinal, epidural or pudendal block) is used to help the mother remain comfortable during the birth. Ascertaining the precise position of the fetal head is paramount, and though historically was accomplished by feeling the fetal skull suture lines and fontanelles, in the modern era, confirmation with ultrasound is essentially mandatory. At this point, the two blades of the forceps are individually inserted, the left blade first for the commonest occipito-anterior position; posterior blade first if a transverse position, then locked. The position on the baby's head is checked. The fetal head is then rotated to the occiput anterior position if it is not already in that position. An episiotomy may be performed if necessary. The baby is then delivered with gentle (maximum 30 lb_{f} or 130 Newton) traction in the axis of the pelvis.

=== Outlet, low, mid or high ===
The accepted clinical standard classification system for forceps deliveries according to station and rotation was developed by the American College of Obstetricians and Gynecologists and consists of:

- Outlet forceps delivery, where the forceps are applied when the fetal head has reached the perineal floor and its scalp is visible between contractions. This type of assisted delivery is performed only when the fetal head is in a straight forward or backward vertex position or in slight rotation (less than 45 degrees to the right or left) from one of these positions.
- Low forceps delivery, when the baby's head is at +2 station or lower. There is no restriction on rotation for this type of delivery.
- Midforceps delivery, when the baby's head is above +2 station. There must be head engagement before it can be carried out.
- High forceps delivery is not performed in modern obstetrics practice. It would be a forceps-assisted vaginal delivery performed when the baby's head is not yet engaged.

== History ==
Abu al-Qasim al-Zahrawi, known in the West as Albucasis, was a pioneering 10th-century physician and surgeon from Al-Andalus. In his comprehensive medical encyclopedia, Al-Tasrif, he introduced over 200 surgical instruments, many of which he designed himself. Notably, al-Zahrawi devised surgical scissors, grasping forceps, and obstetrical forceps.

The obstetric forceps were introduced into the European practice by the eldest son of the Chamberlen family of surgeons. The Chamberlens were French Huguenots from Normandy who worked in Paris before they migrated to England in 1569 to escape the religious violence in France. William Chamberlen, the patriarch of the family, was most likely a surgeon; he had two sons, both named Pierre, who became maverick surgeons and specialists in midwifery. William and the eldest son practiced in Southampton and then settled in London. The inventor was probably the eldest Peter Chamberlen the elder, who became obstetrician-surgeon of Queen Henriette, wife of King Charles I of England and daughter of Henry IV, King of France. He was succeeded by his nephew, Dr. Peter Chamberlen (barbers-surgeons were not doctors in the sense of physician), as royal obstetrician. The success of this dynasty of obstetricians with the royal family and high nobles was related in part to the use of this "secret" instrument allowing delivery of a live child in difficult cases.

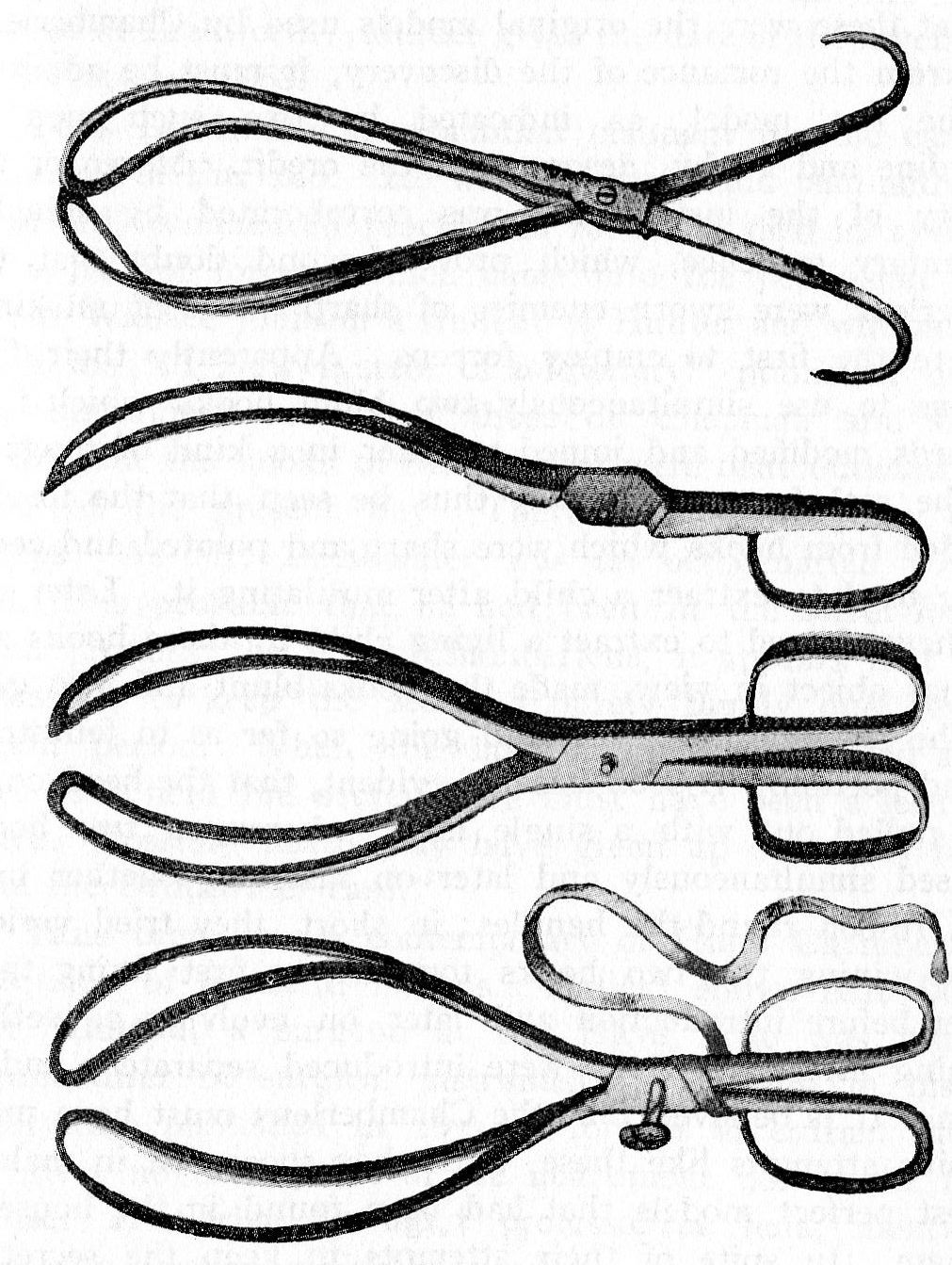
Chamberlen forceps (Maldon)

In fact, the instrument was kept secret for 150 years by the Chamberlen family. Hugh Chamberlen the elder, grandnephew of Peter the eldest, tried to sell the instrument in Paris in 1670, but the demonstration he performed in front of François Mauriceau, responsible for Paris Hotel-Dieu maternity, was a failure which resulted in the death of mother and child. The secret may have been sold by Hugh Chamberlen to Dutch obstetricians at the start of the 18th century in Amsterdam, but there are doubts about the authenticity of what was actually provided to buyers.

The forceps were used most notably in difficult childbirths. The forceps could avoid some infant deaths when previous approaches (involving hooks and other instruments) extracted them in parts. In the interest of secrecy, the forceps were carried into the birthing room in a lined box and would only be used once everyone was out of the room and the mother blindfolded.

Models derived from the Chamberlen instrument finally appeared gradually in England and Scotland in 1735. About 100 years after the invention of the forceps by Peter Chamberlen Sr. a surgeon by the name of Jan Palfijn presented his obstetric forceps to the Paris Academy of Sciences in 1723. They contained parallel blades and were called the Hands of Palfijn.

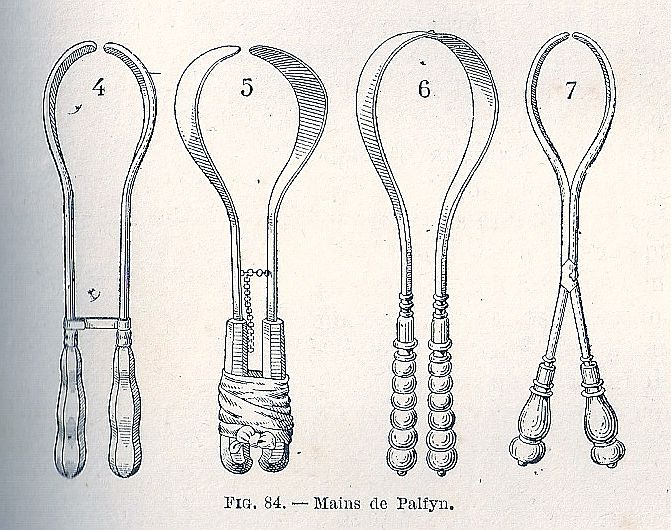
Palfijn "hands" in different versions

These "hands" were possibly the instruments described and used in Paris by Gregoire father and son, Dussée, and Jacques Mesnard.

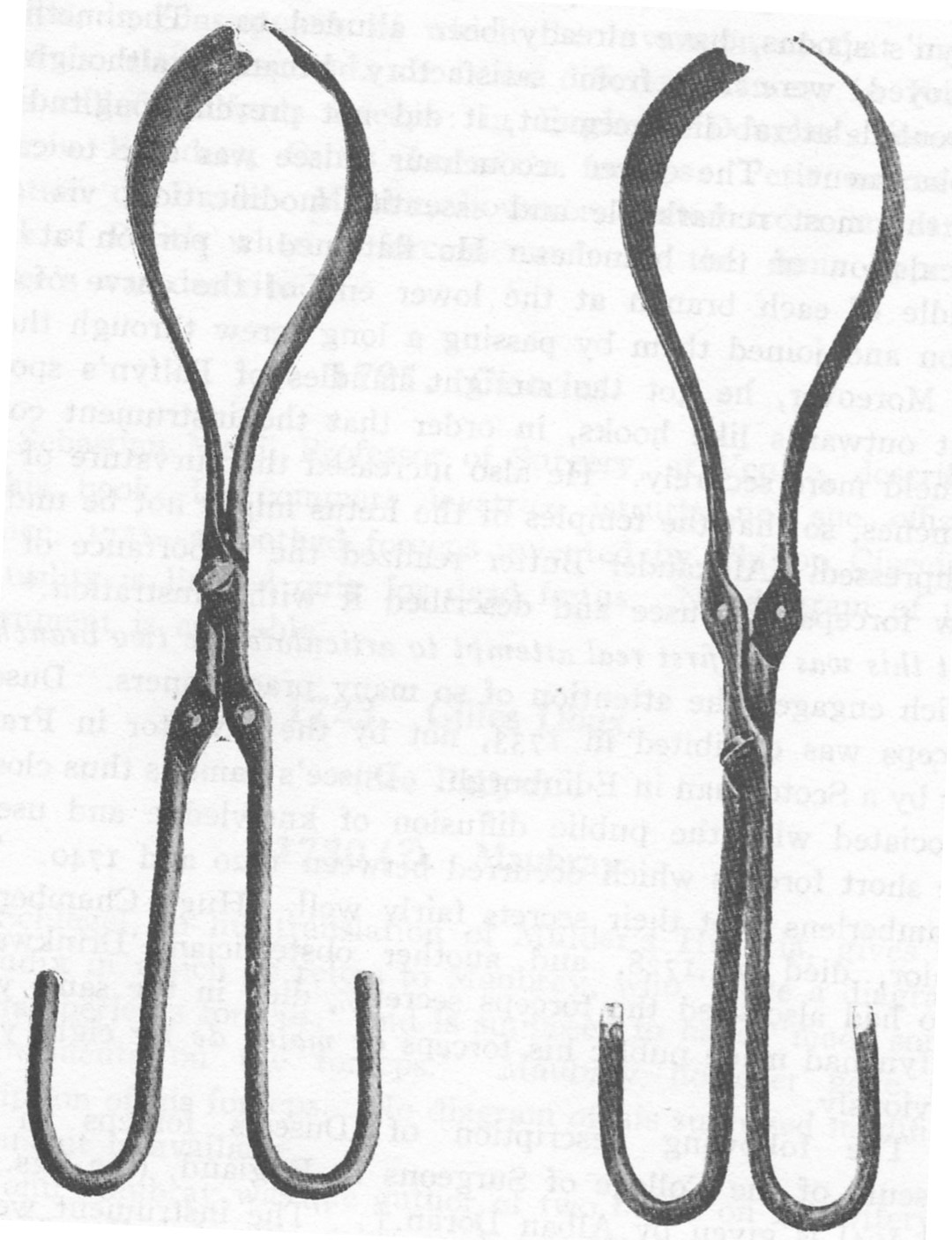
Dussee French forceps (circa 1725) with two different locks

In 1813, Peter Chamberlen's midwifery tools were discovered at Woodham Mortimer Hall near Maldon (UK) in the attic of the house. The instruments were found along with gloves, old coins and trinkets. The tools discovered also contained a pair of forceps that were assumed to have been invented by the father of Peter Chamberlen because of the nature of the design.

The Chamberlen family's forceps were based on the idea of separating the two branches of "sugar clamp" (as those used to remove "stones" from bladder), which were put in place one after another in the birth canal. This was not possible with conventional tweezers previously tested. However, they could only succeed in a maternal pelvis of normal dimensions and on fetal heads already well engaged (i.e. well lowered into maternal pelvis). Abnormalities of pelvis were much more common in the past than today, which complicated the use of Chamberlen forceps. The absence of pelvic curvature of the branches (vertical curvature to accommodate the anatomical curvature of maternal sacrum) prohibited blades from reaching the upper-part of the pelvis and exercising traction in the natural axis of pelvic excavation.

In 1747, French obstetrician Andre Levret, published Observations sur les causes et accidents de plusieurs accouchements laborieux (Observations on the Causes and Accidents of Several difficult Deliveries), in which he described his modification of the instrument to follow the curvature of the maternal pelvis, this "pelvic curve" allowing a grip on a fetal head still high in the pelvic excavation, which could assist in more difficult cases.

First illustration of Levret's pelvic curve – 1747

This improvement was published in 1751 in England by William Smellie in the book A Treatise on the theory and practice of midwifery. After this fundamental improvement, the forceps would become a common obstetrical instrument for more than two centuries.

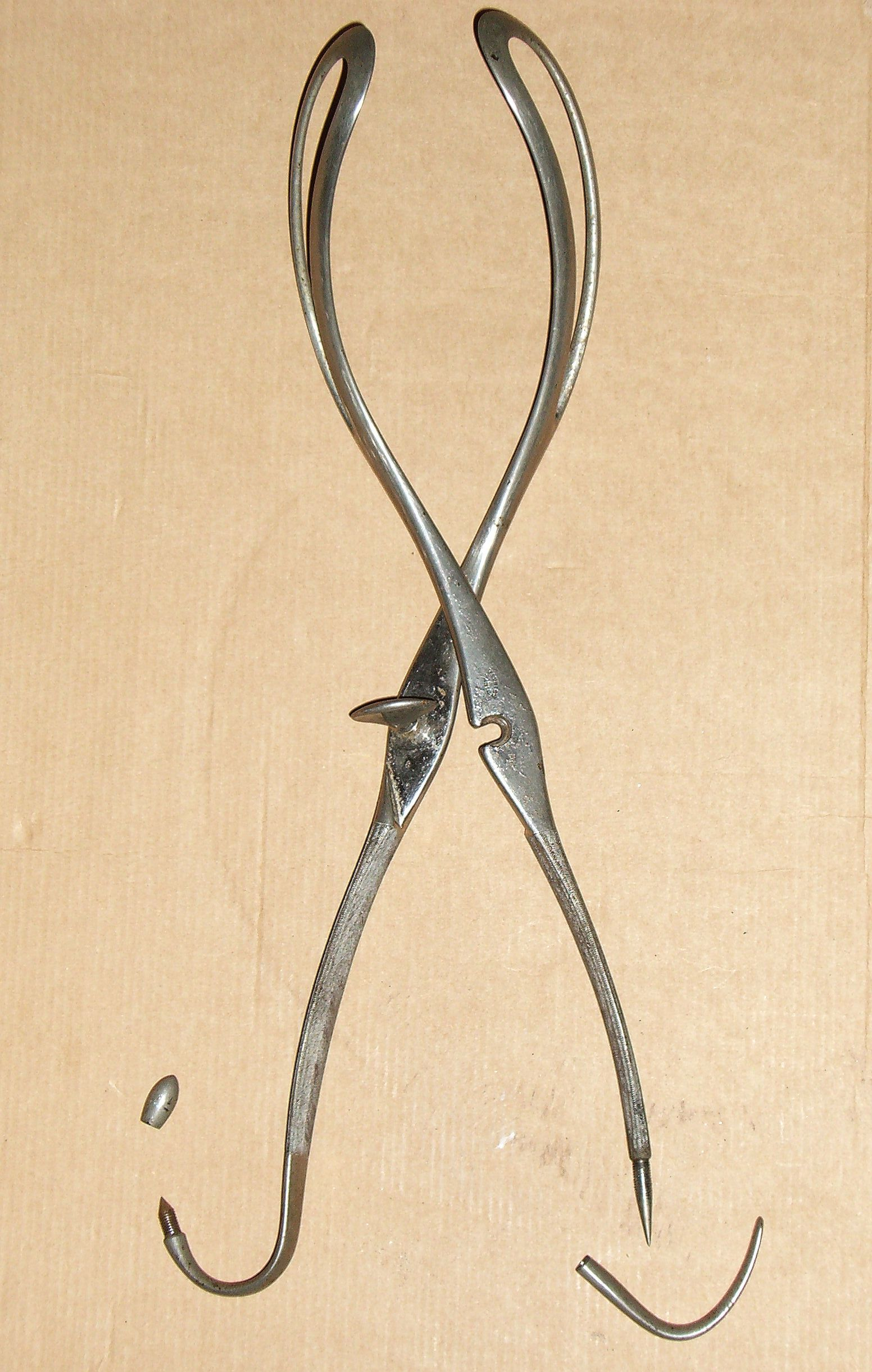
French forceps, Levret-Baudelocque type (1760–1860) with perforator and hook at the end of the handles

The last improvement of the instrument was added in 1877 by a French obstetrician, Stephan Tarnier in "descriptions of two new forceps." This instrument featured a traction system misaligned with the instrument itself, sometimes called the "third curvature of the forceps". This particularly ingenious traction system, allowed the forceps to exercise traction on the head of the child following the axis of the maternal pelvic excavation, which had never been possible before.

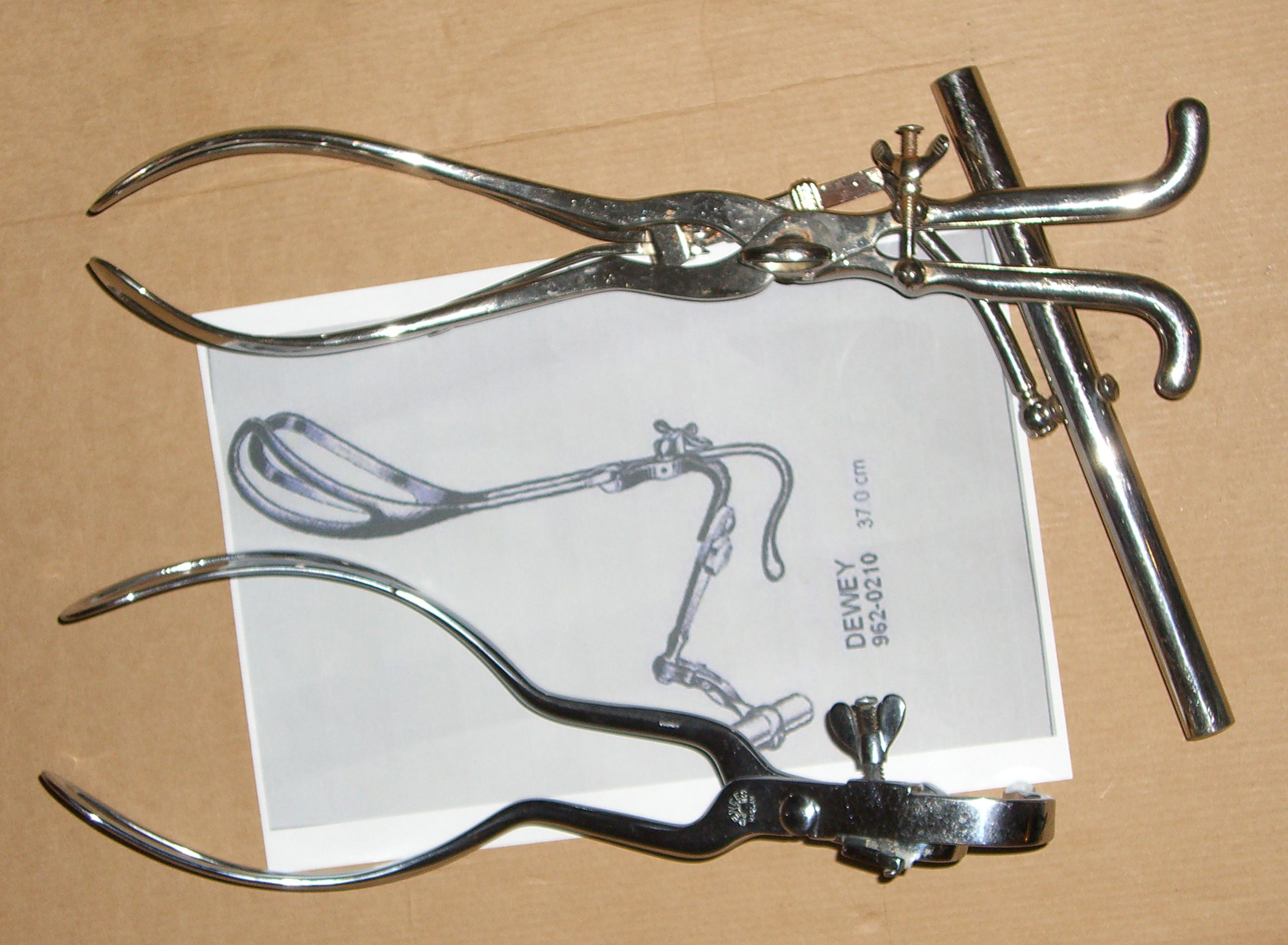
Tarnier forceps with tractor handle (1877) and USA Dewey model (1900)

Tarnier's idea was to "split" mechanically the grabbing of the fetal head (between the forceps blades) on which the operator does not intervene after their correct positioning, from a mechanical accessory set on the forceps itself, the "tractor" on which the operator exercises traction needed to pull down the fetal head in the correct axis of the pelvic excavation. Tarnier forceps (and its multiple derivatives under other names) remained the most widely used system in the world until the development of the cesarean section.

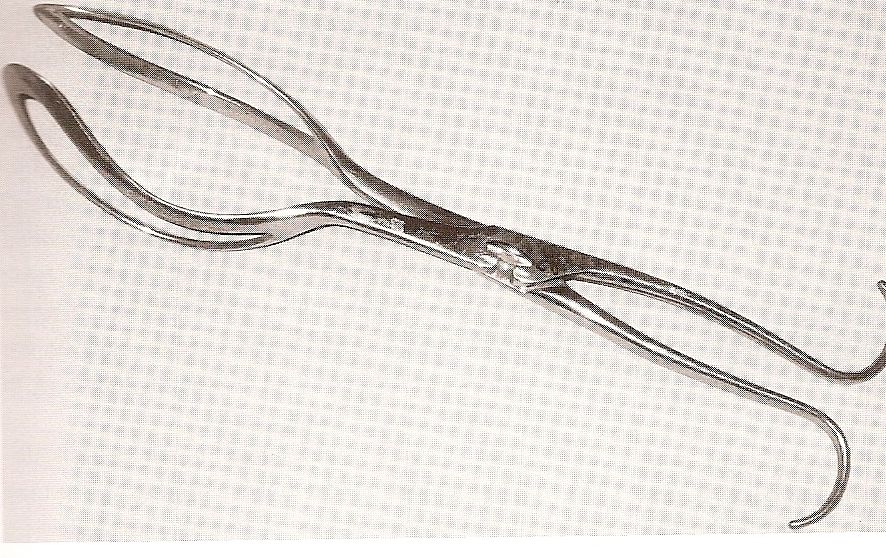
Hodge "Eclectic" forceps – US (1833)

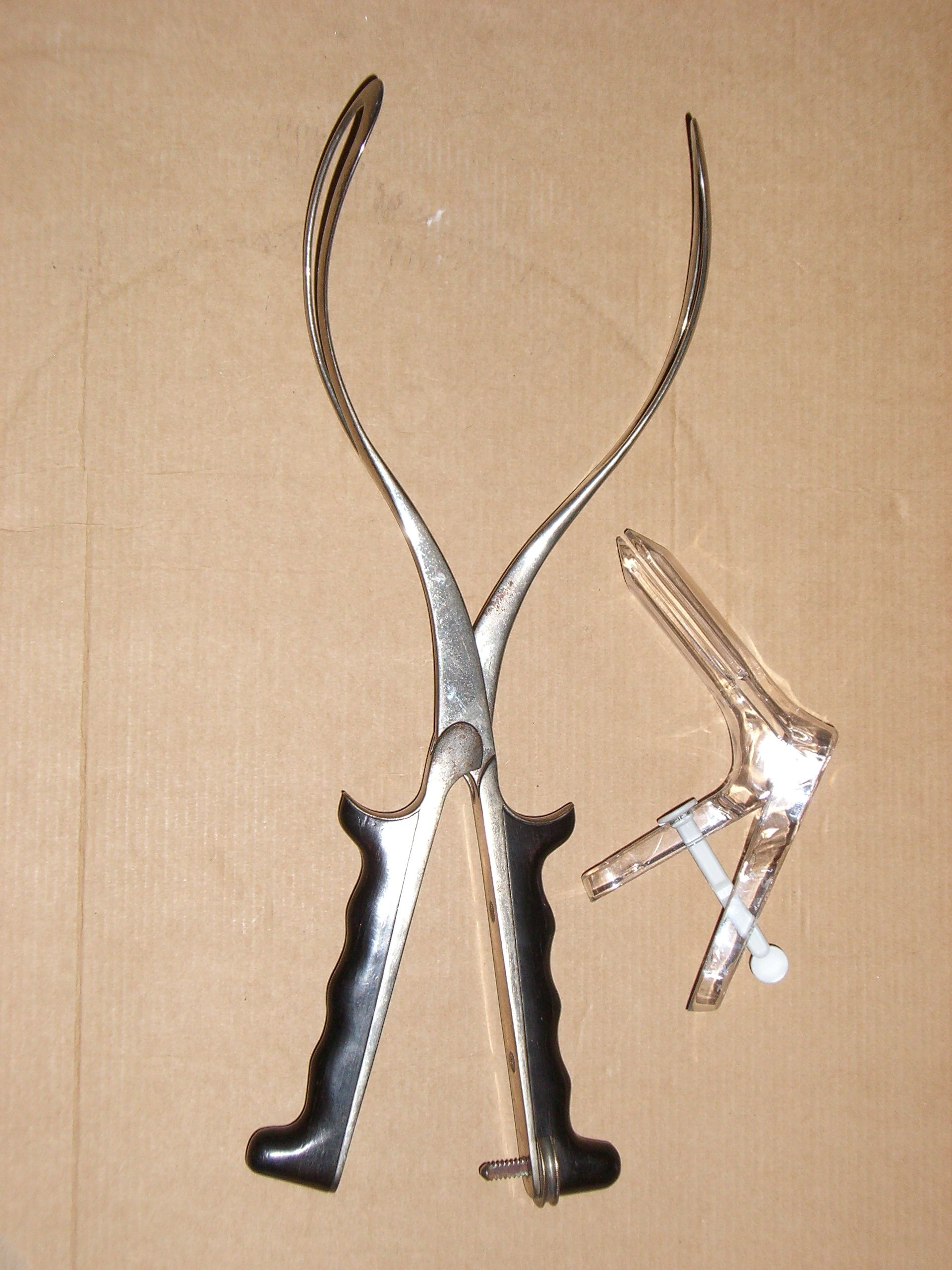
Elliott forceps with "pressure regulating" screw at the end of handles – US (1860)

Forceps had a profound influence on obstetrics as it allowed for the speedy delivery of the baby in cases of difficult or obstructed labour. Over the course of the 19th century, many practitioners attempted to redesign the forceps, so much so that the Royal College of Obstetrics and Gynecologists' collection has several hundred examples. In the last decades, however, with the ability to perform a cesarean section relatively safely, and the introduction of the ventouse or vacuum extractor, the use of forceps and training in the technique of its use has sharply declined.

=== Historical role in the medicalisation of childbirth ===
The introduction of the obstetrical forceps provided huge advances in the medicalisation of childbirth. Before the 18th century, childbirth was thought of as a medical phase that could be overseen by a female relative. Usually, if a doctor had to get involved that meant something had gone wrong. Around this era in the 18th century, there were no female doctors. Since males were exclusively called in under extreme circumstances, the act of childbirth was thought to be better known to a midwife or female relative than a male doctor. Usually the male doctor's job was to save the mother's life if, for example, the baby had become stuck while exiting the mother.

Before the obstetrical forceps, this had to be done by cutting the baby out piece by piece. In other cases, if the baby was deemed undeliverable, then the doctor would use a tool called a crochet. This was used to crush the baby's skull, allowing the baby to be pulled out of the mother's womb. Still in other cases, a caesarean section (c section) could be performed, but this would almost always result in the mother's death. "In addition, women who had forceps deliveries had shorter after-childbirth complications than those who had caesarean sections performed." These procedures came with various risks to the mother's health, along with the death of the baby.

However, with the introduction of the obstetrical forceps, the male doctor had a more important role. In many cases, they could actually save the baby's life if called early enough. Although the use of the forceps in childbirth came with its own set of risks, the positives included a significant decrease in risk to the mother, a decrease in child morbidity, and a decreased risk to the baby. Since the forceps in childbirth were made public around 1720, they gave male doctors a way to assist and even oversee childbirths.

Around this time, in large cities such as London and Paris, some men would become devoted to obstetrical practices. It became stylish among wealthy women of the era to have their childbirth overseen by male midwives. A notable male midwife was William Hunter. He popularised obstetrics. "In 1762, he was appointed as obstetrician to Queen Charlotte." In addition, with the use of forceps, male doctors invented lying-in hospitals to provide safe, somewhat advanced obstetrical care because of the use of the obstetrical forceps.

=== Historical complications ===
Child birth was not considered a medical practice before the 18th century. It was mostly overseen by a midwife, mother, stepmother, neighbor, or any female relative. Around the 19th and 20th centuries, childbirth was considered dangerous for women. With the introduction of obstetrical forceps, this allowed non-medical professionals, such as the aforementioned individuals, to continue to oversee childbirths. In addition, this gave some of the public more comfort in trusting childbirth oversight to common people. However, the introduction of obstetrical forceps also had a negative effect, because there was no medical oversight of childbirth by any kind of medical professional, this exposed the practice to unnecessary risks and complications for the fetus and mother. These risks could range from minimal effects to lifetime consequences for both individuals.

The baby could develop cuts and bruises in various body parts due to the forcible squeezing of the body through the mother's vagina. In addition, there could be bruising on the baby's face if the forceps' handler were to squeeze too tight. In some extreme cases, this could cause temporary or permanent facial nerve injury or lifelong scarring often along the jawline. Furthermore, if the forceps' handler were to twist their wrist while the grip was on the baby's head, this would twist the baby's neck and cause damage to a cranial nerve, resulting in strabismus. In rare cases, a clavicle fracture to the baby could occur. The addition of obstetrical forceps came with complication to the mother during and after childbirth. The use of the forceps gave rise to an increased risk in cuts and lacerations along the vaginal wall.

This, in turn, would cause an increase in post-operative recovery time and increase the pain experienced by the mother. In addition, the use of forceps could cause more difficulty evacuating during the recovery time as compared to a mother who did not use the forceps. While some of these risks and complications were very common, in general, many people overlooked them and continued to use them.

== See also ==
- Instruments used in general surgery
