= Childbirth =

Conclusion of the human pregnancy

- Other names: Labour and delivery, partus, giving birth, parturition, birth, confinement
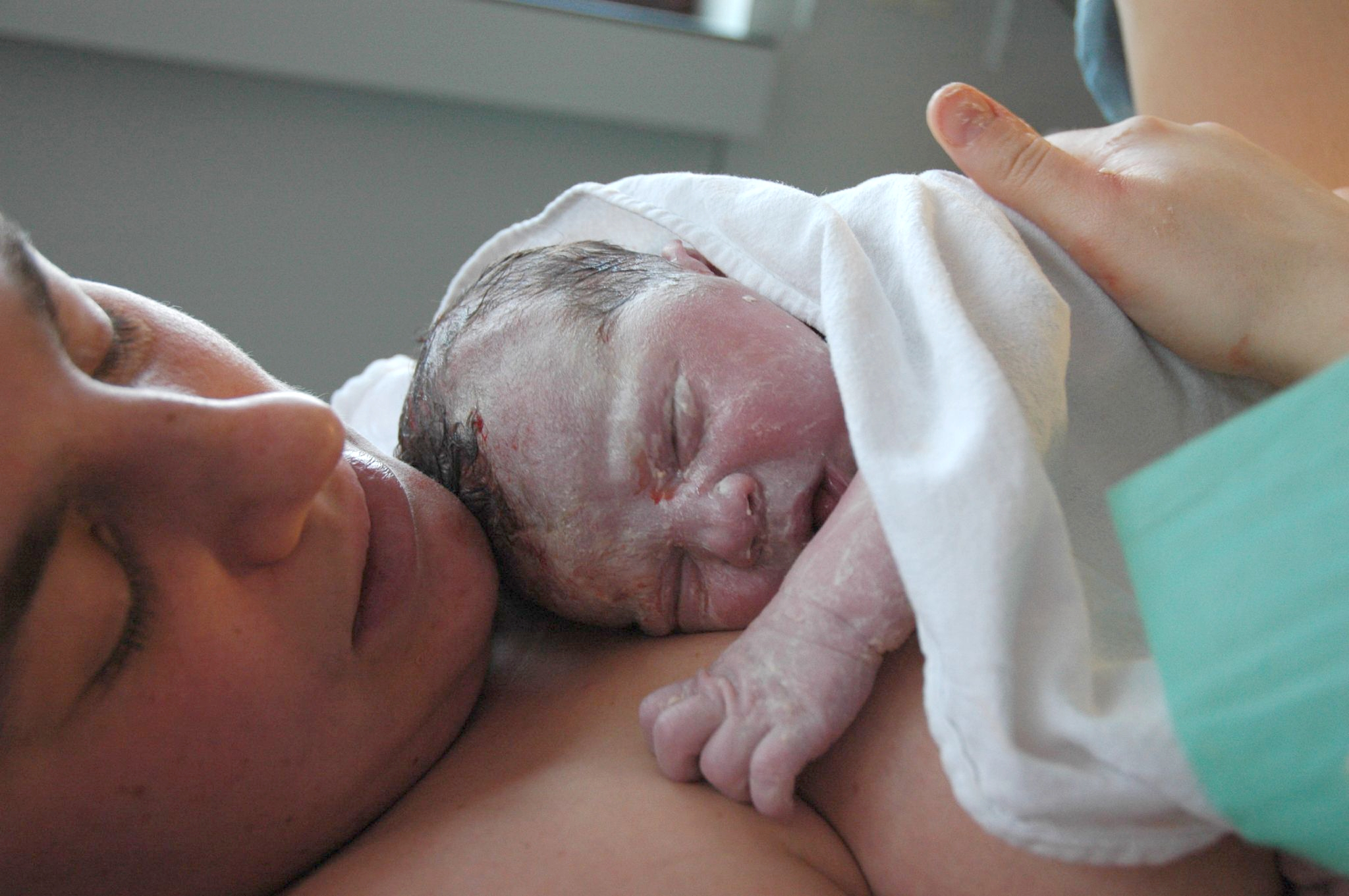
- Mother with neonate covered in vernix caseosa
- Specialty: Obstetrics, midwifery
- Complications: Obstructed labour, postpartum bleeding, eclampsia, postpartum infection, birth asphyxia, neonatal hypothermia
- Types: Vaginal delivery, C-section
- Causes: Pregnancy
- Prevention: Birth control, elective abortion
- Frequency: 135 million (2015)
- Deaths: 260,000 maternal deaths a year (2023)

Childbirth, also known as labour or delivery, is the completion of pregnancy, where one or more fetuses exits the internal environment of the mother vaginally or via caesarean section and becomes a newborn. In 2023, there were about 132 million human births globally. In developed countries, most births occur in hospitals, while in developing countries most are home births.

Vaginal birth is the most common mode of birth worldwide. It involves three stages of labour: the shortening and opening of the cervix during the first stage, descent and birth of the baby during the second, and the birth of the placenta during the third. During the first stage, contractions gradually become stronger and closer together. The postpartum period is the time of recovery for the mother and infant, in which both newborn and mother are monitored. All major health organisations advise that immediately after giving birth, regardless of the mode of birth, that the infant be placed on the mother's chest (termed skin-to-skin contact), and to delay any other routine procedures for at least one to two hours or until the baby has had its first breastfeeding.

Vaginal delivery is generally recommended as a first option. Caesarean section can lead to increased risk of complications and a significantly slower recovery. There are also many natural benefits of a vaginal delivery in both the mother and the baby. Various methods may help with pain, such as relaxation techniques, opioids, and spinal blocks. It is best practice to limit the number of interventions that occur during labour and delivery, such as an elective cesarean section. However, in some cases, a scheduled cesarean section must be planned for a successful delivery and recovery of the mother. An emergency cesarean section may be recommended if unexpected complications occur or little to no progression through the birthing canal is observed in a vaginal delivery.

Each year, complications from pregnancy and childbirth result in about 260,000 birthing deaths, seven million women have serious long-term problems, and 50 million women giving birth have negative health outcomes following delivery, most of which occur in the developing world. Complications in the mother include obstructed labour, postpartum bleeding, eclampsia, and postpartum infection. Complications in the baby include lack of oxygen at birth (birth asphyxia), birth trauma, and prematurity.

== Signs and symptoms ==
The most prominent sign of labour is strong repetitive uterine contractions. Pain in contractions has been described as feeling similar to very strong menstrual cramps. Crowning, when the baby's head becomes visible, may be experienced as an intense stretching and burning.

Back labour is a complication that occurs during childbirth when the feet or the bottom of the baby is visible first (bottom-first presentation), instead of being born head down (head-first presentation). This leads to more intense contractions, and causes pain in the lower back that persists between contractions as the back of the fetus' head exerts pressure on the mother's sacrum.

Another prominent sign of labour is the rupture of membranes, commonly known as "water breaking". During pregnancy, a baby is surrounded and cushioned by a fluid-filled sac (the amniotic sac). Usually, the sac ruptures at the beginning of or during labour. It may cause a gush of fluid or leak in an intermittent or constant flow of small amounts from a woman's vagina. The fluid is clear or pale yellow. If the amniotic sac has not yet broken during labour, the health care provider may break it in a technique called an amniotomy. In an amniotomy a thin plastic hook is used to make a small opening in the sac, causing the water to break. If the sac breaks before labour starts, it's called a prelabour rupture of membranes. Contractions will typically start within 24 hours after the water breaks. If not, the care provider will generally begin labour induction within 24 to 48 hours. If the baby is preterm (less than 37 weeks of pregnancy), the healthcare provider may use a medication to delay delivery.

=== Labour pain ===
Labor pains have both visceral and somatic components. During the first and second stages of labour, uterine contractions cause stretching and opening of the cervix. This, in turn, triggers visceral pain in the inner cervix and lower segment of the spine. Somatic pain is triggered at the end of the first and second stages of labour by pain receptors that supply the nerves on the vaginal surface of the cervix, resulting from stretching, distention, and tearing of the vagina, perineum, and pelvic floor. Compared to visceral pain, somatic pain is more resistant to opioid pain medication. Nitrous oxide may be used in hospitals and birthing centres for this reason.

Beyond physical pain, there are also well-documented biocultural and psychosocial aspects of labour pain and pain management. Pain is experienced distinctly by different cultures, and various culturally-relevant interventions can lessen labour pain, such as having extended female family members present during childbirth. Labour might be less painful in subsequent births, and this has been associated with lessened fear.

Pain management techniques during labour can include pain relief with medication (such as an epidural injection), coping techniques (such as the Lamaze breathing), or submergence in water.

=== Psychological ===
During the later stages of gestation, there is an increase in abundance of oxytocin, a hormone that is known to evoke feelings of contentment, reductions in anxiety, and feelings of calmness. Oxytocin is further released during labour when the fetus stimulates the cervix and vagina, and it is believed that it plays a major role in the bonding of a mother to her infant and in the establishment of maternal behaviour. The father of the child also has an increase in oxytocin levels following contact with the infant, and parents with higher oxytocin levels show being more responsive and "in synch" in their interactions with their infant. The act of nursing a child also causes a release of oxytocin to help the baby get milk more easily from the nipple.

== Stages of labour ==
Sequence of images showing the stages of ordinary childbirth

Labour is typically divided into three stages: the shortening and opening of the cervix during the first stage, descent and birth of the baby during the second, and the delivery of the placenta during the third. The first stage is characterised by abdominal cramping or back pain that typically lasts around half a minute and occurs every 10 to 30 minutes. The contractions (and pain) gradually become stronger and closer together. The second stage ends when the infant is fully expelled. In the third stage, the delivery of the placenta occurs.

The postpartum period (sometimes called the fourth stage) involves recovery, the uterus beginning to contract to the pre-pregnancy state, and monitoring of the neonatal tone and vitals. All major health organisations advise that immediately following a live birth, regardless of the delivery method, that the infant be placed on the mother's chest, termed skin-to-skin contact, and delaying routine procedures for at least one to two hours or until the baby has had its first breastfeeding.

Station refers to the relationship of the fetal presenting part to the level of the ischial spines. When the presenting part is at the ischial spines, the station is 0 (synonymous with engagement). If the presenting fetal part is above the spines, the distance is measured and described as minus stations, which range from −1 to −4 cm. If the presenting part is below the ischial spines, the distance is stated as plus stations ( +1 to +4 cm). At +3 and +4, the presenting part is at the perineum and can be seen.

The baby's head may temporarily change shape (becoming more elongated or cone-shaped) as it moves through the birth canal. This change in the shape of the fetal head is called moulding and is much more prominent in women having their first vaginal delivery.

Cervical ripening is the physical and chemical changes in the cervix to prepare it for the stretching that will take place as the fetus moves out of the uterus and into the birth canal. A scoring system called a Bishop score can be used to judge the degree of cervical ripening to predict the timing of labour and delivery of the infant or for women at risk for preterm labour. It is also used to judge when a woman will respond to induction of labour for a postterm pregnancy or other medical reasons. There are several methods of inducing cervical ripening, which will allow the uterine contractions to effectively dilate the cervix.

=== Onset of labour ===
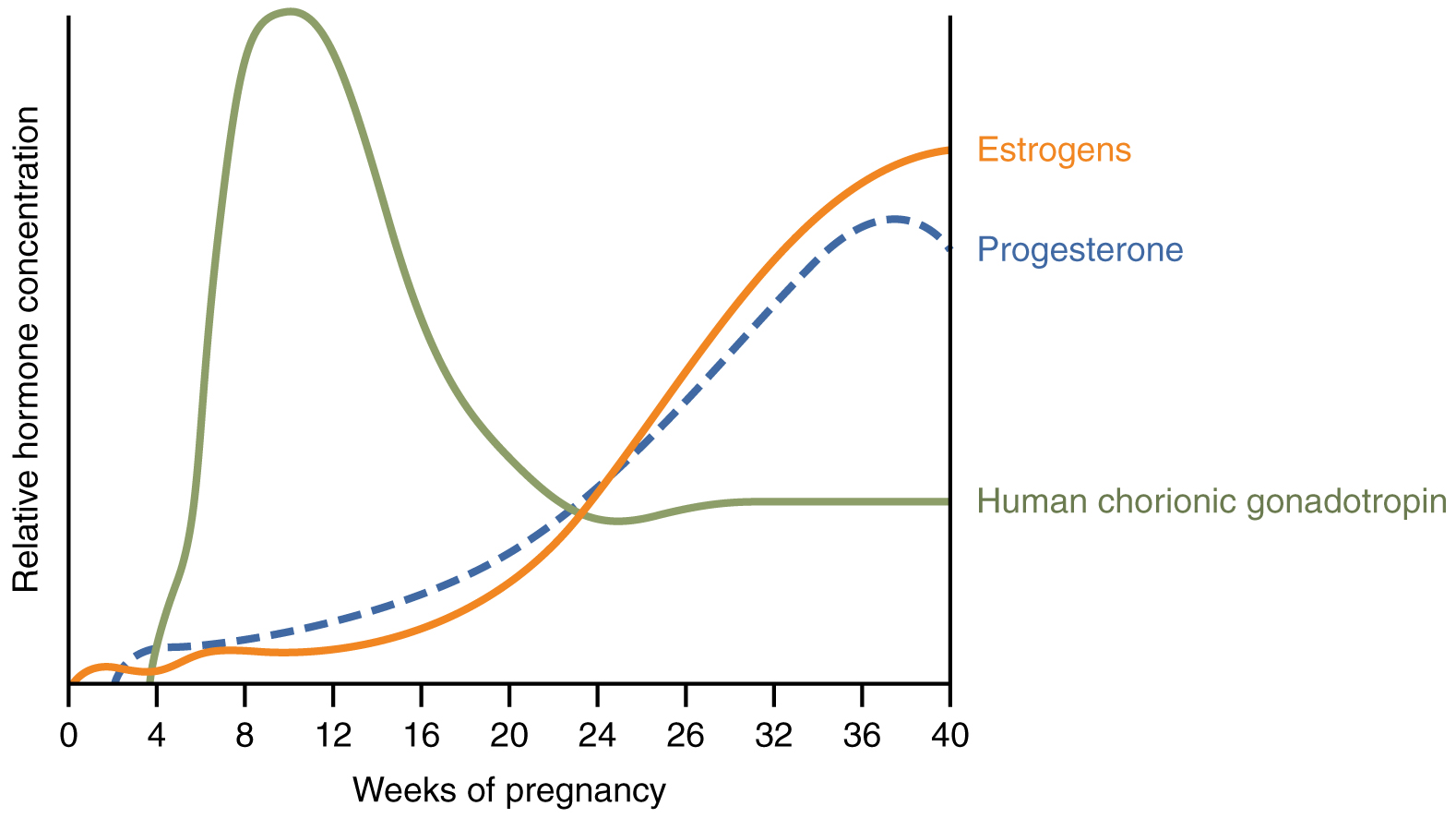
The hormones initiating labour

Definitions of the onset of labour include:

- Regular contractions at least every six minutes with evidence of change in cervical dilation or cervical effacement between consecutive examinations.
- Regular contractions occurring less than 10 minutes apart and progressive cervical dilation or cervical effacement.
- At least three painful regular contractions during 10 minutes, each lasting more than 45 seconds.

Common signs that labour is about to begin may include what is known as lightening, which is the process of the baby moving down from the rib cage with the head of the baby engaging deep in the pelvis. The pregnant woman may then find breathing easier, since her lungs have more room for expansion, but pressure on her bladder may cause a more frequent need to urinate. Lightening may occur a few weeks or a few hours before labour begins, or even not until labour has begun. Some women also experience an increase in vaginal discharge several days before labour begins when the "mucus plug", a thick plug of mucus that blocks the opening to the uterus, is pushed out into the vagina. The mucus plug may become dislodged days before labour begins or not until the start of labour.

While inside the uterus, the baby is enclosed in a fluid-filled membrane called the amniotic sac. Shortly before, at the beginning of, or during labour, the sac ruptures, commonly known as the "water breaking". Once the sac ruptures, the baby is at risk for infection, and the mother's medical team will assess the need to induce labour if it has not started within the time they believe to be safe for the infant.

=== First stage ===
The first stage of labour is divided into latent and active phases, where the latent phase is sometimes included in the definition of labour, and sometimes not.

The latent phase is generally defined as beginning at the point at which the woman perceives regular uterine contractions. In contrast, Braxton Hicks contractions, which are contractions that may start around 26 weeks gestation and are sometimes called "false labour", are infrequent, irregular, and involve only mild cramping. Braxton Hicks contractions are the uterine muscles preparing to deliver the infant.

Cervical effacement, which is the thinning and stretching of the cervix, and cervical dilation occur during the closing weeks of pregnancy. Effacement is usually complete or near-complete, and dilation is about 5 cm by the end of the latent phase. The degree of cervical effacement and dilation may be felt during a vaginal examination.

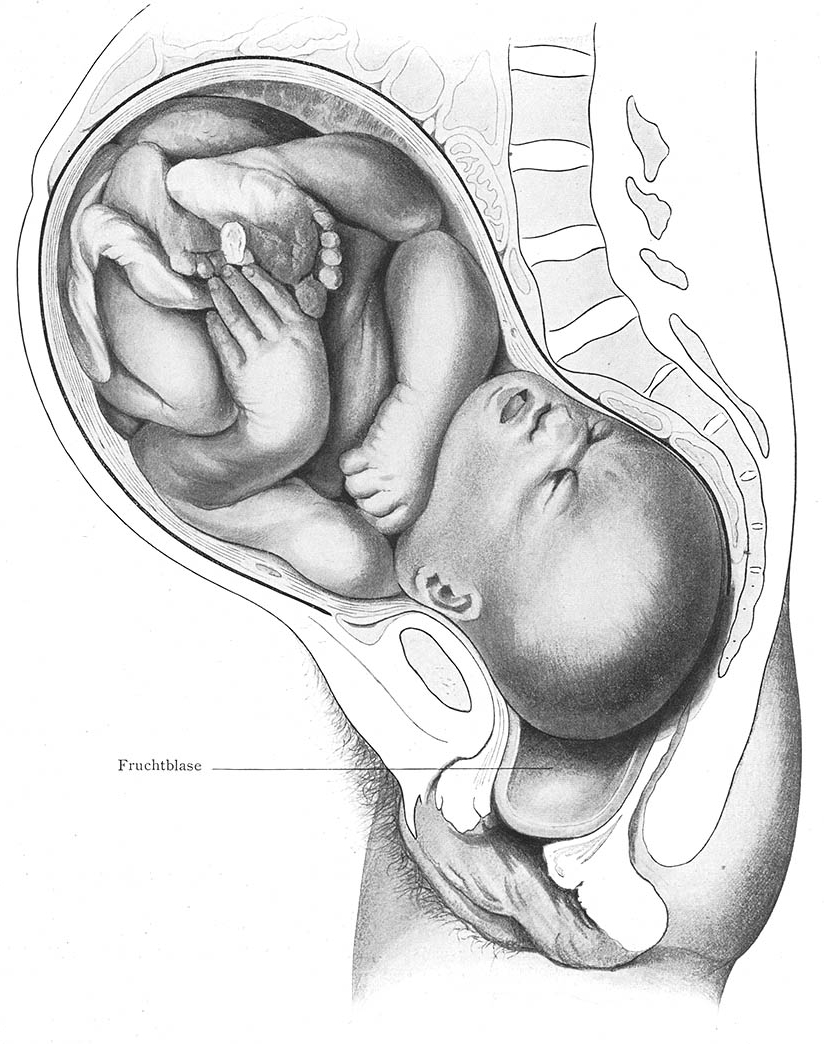
Engagement of the fetal head

The active phase of labour has geographically differing definitions. The World Health Organization describes the active first stage as "a period of time characterised by regular painful uterine contractions, a substantial degree of cervical effacement and more rapid cervical dilatation from 5 cm until full dilatation for first and subsequent labours". In the US, the definition of active labour was changed from 3 to 4 cm, to 5 cm of cervical dilation for mothers who had given birth previously, and at 6 cm for those who had not given birth before. This was done in an effort to increase the rates of vaginal delivery.

Health care providers may assess the mother's progress in labour by performing a cervical exam to evaluate the cervical dilation, effacement, and station. These factors form the Bishop score. The Bishop score can also be used as a means to predict the success of an induction of labour.

During effacement, the cervix becomes incorporated into the lower segment of the uterus. During a contraction, uterine muscles contract, causing shortening of the upper segment and drawing upwards of the lower segment, in a gradual expulsive motion. The presenting fetal part is then permitted to descend. Full dilation is reached when the cervix has widened enough to allow passage of the baby's head, around 10 cm dilation for a term baby.

A standard duration of the latent first stage has not been established and can vary widely from one woman to another. However, the duration of the active first stage (from 5 cm until full cervical dilatation) usually does not extend beyond 12 hours in the labour of first-time mothers, and usually does not extend beyond 10 hours in subsequent pregnancies.

=== Second stage ===
The second stage begins when the cervix is fully dilated and ends when the baby is born. As pressure on the cervix increases, a sensation of pelvic pressure is experienced, and, with it, an urge to begin pushing. At the beginning of the normal second stage, the head is fully engaged in the pelvis; the widest diameter of the head has passed below the level of the pelvic inlet. The fetal head then continues descent into the pelvis, below the pubic arch and out through the vaginal opening. This is assisted by the additional maternal efforts of pushing, or bearing down, similar to defecation. The appearance of the fetal head at the vaginal opening is termed crowning. At this point, the mother will feel an intense burning or stinging sensation, sometimes dubbed the "ring of fire". When the amniotic sac has not ruptured during labour or pushing, the infant can be born with the membranes intact. This is referred to as delivery en caul. If there is a rupture of the membranes and the amniotic sack breaks, covering just the head of the newborn, it is called a caul birth (or birth "in caul").

Complete expulsion of the baby signals the successful completion of the second stage of labour. Some babies, especially preterm infants, are born covered with a waxy or cheese-like white substance called vernix. It is thought to have some protective roles during fetal development and for a few hours after birth.

The second stage varies from one woman to another. In the first labour, birth is usually completed within three hours, whereas in subsequent labours, birth is usually completed within two hours. Second-stage labours longer than three hours are associated with declining rates of spontaneous vaginal delivery and increasing rates of infection, perineal tears, and obstetric haemorrhage, as well as the need for intensive care of the neonate.

=== Third stage ===
The period from just after the fetus is expelled until just after the placenta is expelled is called the third stage of labour or the involution stage. Placental expulsion begins as a physiological separation from the wall of the uterus. The average time from delivery of the baby until complete expulsion of the placenta is estimated to be 10–12 minutes dependent on whether active or expectant management is employed. In as many as 3% of all vaginal deliveries, the duration of the third stage is longer than 30 minutes and raises concern for retained placenta.

Placental expulsion can be managed actively or it can be managed expectantly, allowing the placenta to be expelled without medical assistance. Active management is the administration of a uterotonic drug within one minute of fetal delivery, controlled traction of the umbilical cord, and fundal massage after delivery of the placenta, followed by performance of uterine massage every 15 minutes for two hours. Active management of the third stage of labour in vaginal deliveries helps to prevent postpartum haemorrhage.

Delaying the clamping of the umbilical cord for at least one minute or until it ceases to pulsate, which may take several minutes, improves outcomes as long as there is the ability to treat jaundice if it occurs. For many years, it was believed that late cord cutting led to a mother's risk of experiencing significant bleeding after giving birth, called postpartum bleeding. However, delaying cord cutting in healthy full-term infants results in early haemoglobin concentration and higher birthweight and increased iron reserves up to six months after birth, with no change in the rate of postpartum bleeding.

=== Postpartum period ===
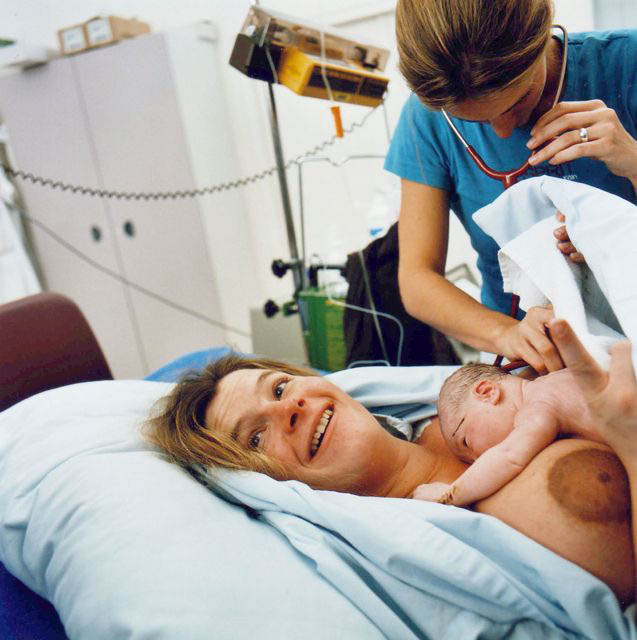
Newborn rests as caregiver checks breath sounds.

Postpartum, sometimes termed the fourth stage of labour, is the period beginning immediately after childbirth, and extends for about six weeks. The terms postpartum and postnatal are often used for this period. The woman's body, including hormone levels and uterus size, return to a non-pregnant state and the newborn adjusts to life outside the mother's body. The World Health Organization (WHO) describes the postnatal period as the most critical and yet the most neglected phase in the lives of mothers and babies; most deaths occur during the postnatal period.

Following the birth, if the mother had an episiotomy or a tearing of the perineum, it is stitched. This is also an optimal time for uptake of long-acting reversible contraception (LARC), such as the contraceptive implant or intrauterine device (IUD), both of which can be inserted immediately after delivery while the woman is still in the delivery room. The mother has regular assessments for uterine contraction and fundal height, vaginal bleeding, heart rate and blood pressure, and temperature, for the first 24 hours after birth. Some women may experience an uncontrolled episode of shivering or postpartum chills following the birth. The first passing of urine should be documented within six hours. Afterpains (pains similar to menstrual cramps), contractions of the uterus to prevent excessive blood flow, continue for several days. Vaginal discharge, termed "lochia", can be expected to continue for several weeks; initially bright red, it gradually becomes pink, changing to brown, and finally to yellow or white.

At one time, babies born in hospitals were removed from their mothers shortly after birth and brought to the mother only at feeding times. Mothers were told that their newborns would be safer in the nursery and that the separation would offer the mothers more time to rest. As attitudes began to change, some hospitals offered a "rooming in" option wherein, after a period of routine hospital procedures and observation, the infant could be allowed to share the mother's room. As of 2020, rooming-in has increasingly become standard practice in maternity wards.

==== Early skin-to-skin contact ====
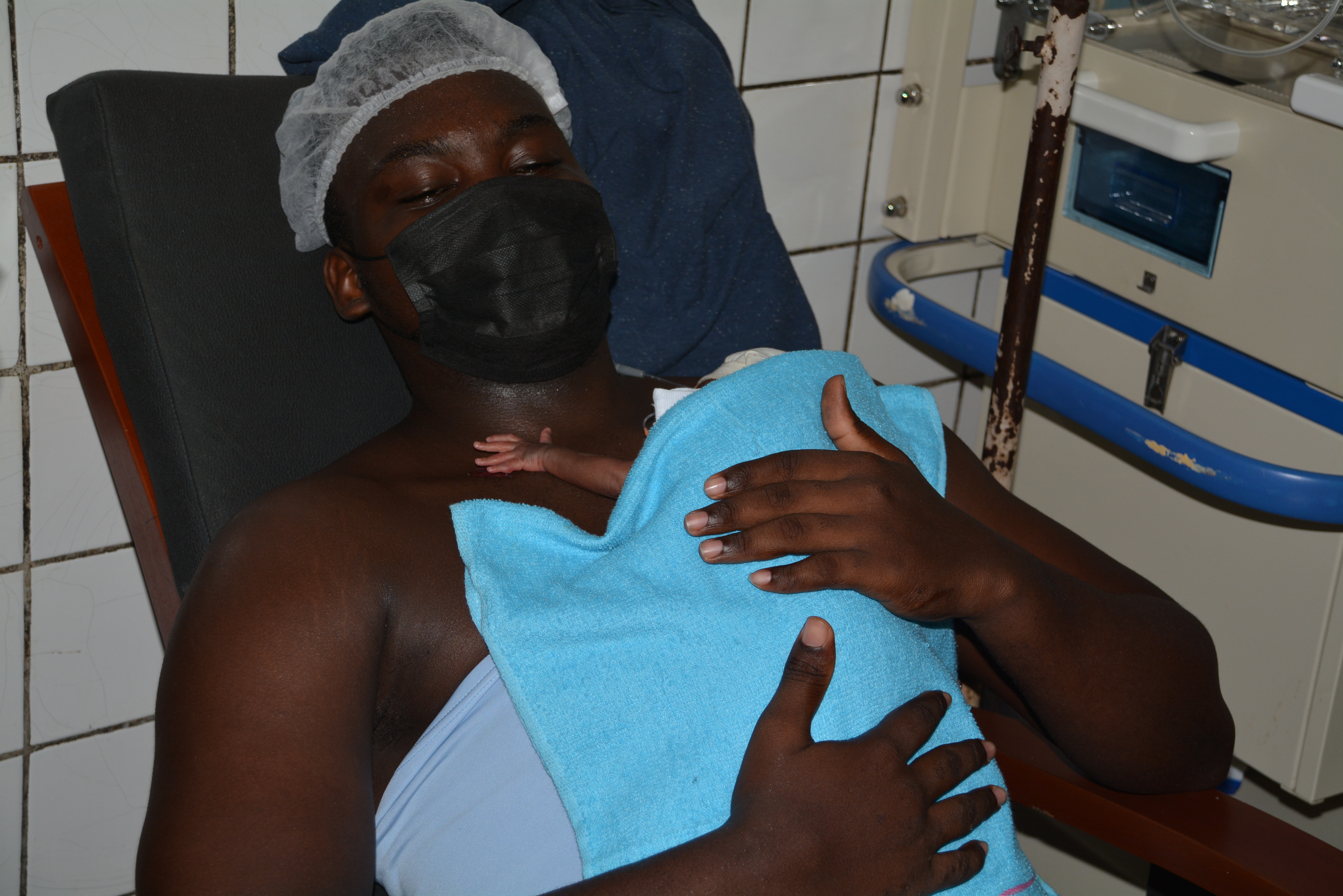
Kangaroo care by father in Cameroon

Skin-to-skin contact (SSC), sometimes also called kangaroo care, is a technique of newborn care where babies are kept chest-to-chest and skin-to-skin with a parent, typically their mother or possibly the father. This means without the shirt or undergarments on the chest of both the baby and the parent. Early skin-to-skin contact results in a decrease in infant crying, improves cardio-respiratory stability and blood glucose levels, and improves breastfeeding duration and effectiveness.

Early postpartum SSC is endorsed by all relevant major organisations. The World Health Organization (WHO) states that "the process of childbirth is not finished until the baby has safely transferred from placental to mammary nutrition." It is advised that the newborn be placed skin-to-skin with the mother following vaginal birth, or as soon as the mother is alert and responsive after a Caesarean section, postponing any routine procedures for at least one to two hours or until the baby has had its first breastfeeding. The baby's father or other support person may also choose to hold the baby SSC until the mother recovers from the anaesthetic.

The WHO suggests that any initial observations of the infant can be done while the infant remains close to the mother, saying that even a brief separation before the baby has had its first feed can disturb the bonding process. They further advise frequent skin-to-skin contact as much as possible during the first days after delivery, especially if it was interrupted for some reason after the delivery.

It has long been known that a mother's level of the hormone oxytocin elevates when she interacts with her infant. The oxytocin level in fathers who engage in SSC is increased as well, and SSC reduces stress and anxiety in parents after interaction."

== Management ==
=== Natural childbirth ===
The reemergence of "natural childbirth" began in Europe and was adopted by some in the US as early as the late 1940s. Early supporters believed that the drugs used during deliveries interfered with "happy childbirth" and could negatively impact the newborn's "emotional well-being". By the 1970s, the call for natural childbirth had spread nationwide, in conjunction with the second-wave of the feminist movement and the nascence of Christian fundamentalism. While it is still most common for American women to deliver in the hospital, supporters of natural birth still widely exist, especially in the UK where midwife-assisted home births have gained popularity.

=== Coping ===
Distress levels vary widely during pregnancy as well as during labour and delivery. They appear to be influenced by fear and anxiety levels, experience with prior childbirth, cultural ideas of childbirth pain, mobility during labour, and the support received during labour.

Personal expectations, the amount of support from caregivers, quality of the caregiver–patient relationship, and involvement in decision-making are more important in the mother's overall satisfaction with the birthing experience than are other influencing factors such as age, socioeconomic status, ethnicity, preparation, physical environment, pain, immobility, or medical interventions.

=== Aid ===
Obstetric care frequently subjects women to institutional routines, which may have adverse effects on the progress of labour. Supportive care during labour may involve emotional support, comfort measures, and information and advocacy, which may promote the physical process of labour as well as women's feelings of control and competence, thus reducing the need for obstetric intervention. The continuous support may be provided either by hospital staff such as nurses or midwives, doulas, or by companions of the woman's choice from her social network.

Continuous labour support may help women to give birth spontaneously, that is, without caesarean or vacuum or forceps, with slightly shorter labours, and to have more positive feelings regarding their experience of giving birth. Continuous labour support may also reduce women's use of pain medication during labour and reduce the risk of babies having low five-minute Apgar scores.

The participation of the child's father in the birth contributes to a better birth experience for the mother, promotes paternal bonding, and makes the transition to fatherhood easier.

=== Preparation ===
Eating or drinking during labour is an area of ongoing debate. While some have argued that eating in labour has no harmful effects on outcomes, others continue to have concern regarding the increased possibility of an aspiration event (choking on recently eaten foods) in the event of an emergency delivery due to the increased relaxation of the oesophagus in pregnancy, upward pressure of the uterus on the stomach, and the possibility of general anaesthetic in the event of an emergency cesarean. However with good obstetrical anaesthesia there is no additional harm from allowing eating and drinking during labour in those who are unlikely to need surgery. Additionally, not eating does not necessarily mean that the mother's stomach is empty or that its contents are not as acidic.

At one time, shaving of the area around the vagina was a common practice due to the belief that hair removal reduced the risk of infection, made an episiotomy (a surgical cut to enlarge the vaginal entrance) easier, and helped with instrumental deliveries. It is currently less common, though it is still a routine procedure in some countries, even though there is no scientific evidence to recommend shaving. Side effects appear later, including irritation, redness, and multiple superficial scratches from the razor. Another effort to prevent infection has been the use of the antiseptic chlorhexidine or providone-iodine solution in the vagina. However, it is unclear if chlorhexidine offers any benefits in preventing infections. Providone-iodine decreases the risk of infection when a cesarean section is to be performed.

=== Labour induction ===
Labor induction is the procedure where a medical professional starts the process of labour instead of letting it start on its own. Labor may be induced (started) if the health of the mother or the baby is at risk. Induction of labour can be accomplished with medication or mechanical methods.

Medical guidelines recommend a full evaluation of the maternal-fetal status, the status of the cervix, and at least 39 completed weeks (full term) of gestation for optimal health of the newborn when considering elective induction of labour. Indications for induction may include:

- Problems with the placenta
- Health issues with the fetus
- Maternal conditions such as gestational diabetes or chronic kidney disease
- Preeclampsia, eclampsia or gestational hypertension
- Premature rupture of membranes
- Postterm pregnancy

Induction may also be considered for logistical reasons, such as the distance from the hospital or psychosocial conditions. In these instances, gestational age confirmation must be done, and the maturity of the fetal lung must be confirmed by testing. The contraindications for induced labour are the same as for spontaneous vaginal delivery, including vasa previa, complete placenta praevia, umbilical cord prolapse or active genital herpes infection, in which cases a cesarean section is the safest delivery method.

Women often do not receive clear and detailed information about the process of labour induction, its benefits and risks. For example women might not know how long the process will last, how long they need to stay in the hospital and how strong the pain caused by the procedure would be. Providing up-to-date information about the procedure allows women to make an informed choice and give an informed consent or refuse the induction.

=== Forceps or vacuum-assisted delivery ===
An assisted delivery is used in about 1 in 8 births, and may be needed if either the mother or infant appears to be at risk during a vaginal delivery. The methods used are termed obstetrical forceps extraction and vacuum extraction, also called ventouse extraction. Done properly, they are both safe, with some preference for forceps rather than vacuum, and both are seen as preferable to an unexpected C-section. While considered safe, some risks for the mother include vaginal tearing, including a higher chance of having a more major vaginal tear that involves the muscle or wall of the anus or rectum. For women undergoing operative vaginal delivery with vacuum extraction or forceps, there is strong evidence that prophylactic antibiotics help to reduce the risk of infection. There is a higher risk of blood clots forming in the legs or pelvis – anti-clot stockings or medication may be ordered to avoid clots. Urinary incontinence is not unusual after childbirth, but it is more common after an instrumental delivery. Certain exercises and physiotherapy will help the condition improve.

=== Pain control ===
==== Non-pharmaceutical ====
Some women prefer to avoid analgesic medication during childbirth. Psychological preparation may be beneficial. Relaxation techniques, immersion in water, massage, and acupuncture may provide pain relief. Acupuncture and relaxation were found to decrease the number of caesarean sections required. Immersion in water has been found to relieve pain during the first stage of labour, reduce the need for anaesthesia, and shorten the duration of labour. Additionally, water birth is associated with a decreased risk of postpartum haemorrhaging, low Apgar scores, neonatal infections, requirement for neonatal resuscitation, and neonatal admission to intensive care. However, there is a higher chance of cord avulsion.

Most women like to have someone to support them during labour and birth, such as a midwife, nurse, or doula; or a lay person, such as the father of the baby, a family member, or a close friend. Studies have found that continuous support during labour and delivery reduces the need for medication and a caesarean or operative vaginal delivery, and results in an improved Apgar score for the infant.

==== Pharmaceutical ====
Different measures for pain control have varying degrees of success and side effects for the woman and her baby. In some countries of Europe, doctors commonly prescribe inhaled nitrous oxide gas for pain control, especially as 53% nitrous oxide, 47% oxygen, known as Entonox; in the UK, midwives may use this gas without a doctor's prescription. Opioids such as fentanyl may be used, but if given too close to birth there is a risk of respiratory depression in the infant.

Popular medical pain control in hospitals includes the regional anaesthetics epidurals (EDA), and spinal anaesthesia. Epidural analgesia is a generally safe and effective method of relieving pain in labour, but has been associated with longer labour, more operative intervention (particularly instrumental delivery), and cost increases. However, a more recent (2017) Cochrane review suggests that the new epidural techniques have no effect on labour time and the use of instruments or the need for C-section deliveries. Generally, pain and stress hormones rise throughout labour for women without epidurals, while pain, fear, and stress hormones decrease upon administration of epidural analgesia, but rise again later. Medicine administered via epidural can cross the placenta and enter the bloodstream of the fetus. Epidural analgesia has no statistically significant impact on the risk of caesarean section, and does not appear to have an immediate effect on neonatal status as determined by Apgar scores.

=== Augmentation ===
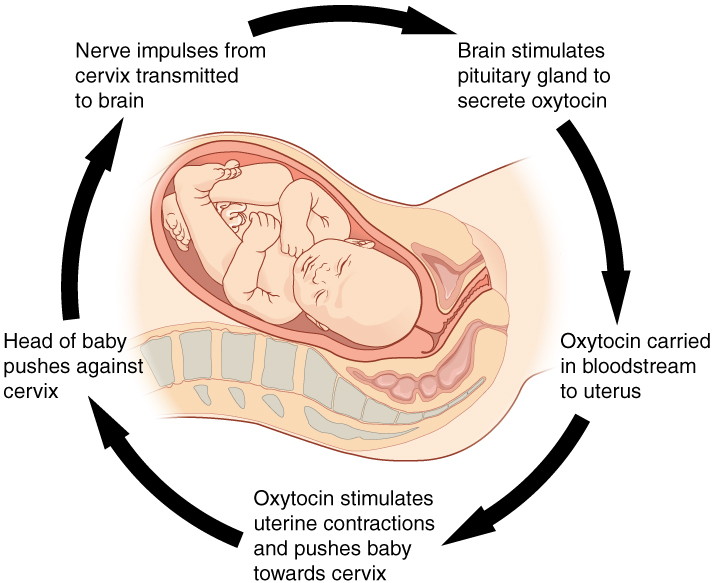
Oxytocin facilitates labour and will follow a positive feedback loop.

Augmentation is the process of stimulating the uterus to increase the intensity and duration of contractions after labour has begun. Several methods of augmentation are commonly used to treat the slow progress of labour (dystocia) when uterine contractions are assessed to be too weak. Oxytocin is the most common method used to increase the rate of vaginal delivery. The World Health Organization recommends its use either alone or with amniotomy (rupture of the amniotic membrane) but advises that it must be used only after it has been correctly confirmed that labour is not proceeding properly if harm is to be avoided. The WHO does not recommend the use of antispasmodic agents for the prevention of delay in labour.

=== Episiotomy ===
For years, an episiotomy was thought to help prevent more extensive vaginal tears and heal better than a natural tear. Perineal tears can occur at the vaginal opening as the baby's head passes through, especially if the baby descends quickly. Tears can involve the perineal skin or extend to the muscles and the anal sphincter and anus. Once common, they are now recognised as generally not needed. When needed, the midwife or obstetrician makes a surgical cut in the perineum to prevent severe tears that can be difficult to repair. Conducting episiotomy when necessary (restrictive episiotomy) appears to give several benefits compared to using routine episiotomy. Women experience less severe perineal trauma, less posterior perineal trauma, less suturing, and fewer healing complications at seven days. Furthermore, it does not cause a higher occurrence of pain, urinary incontinence, painful sex, or severe vaginal/perineal trauma after birth.

=== Multiple births ===
In cases of a head first-presenting first twin, twins can often be delivered vaginally. In some cases, twin delivery is done in a larger delivery room or in an operating theatre, in the event of complications, e.g.,

- Both twins born vaginally – this can occur, both presented head first or where one comes head first, and the other is breech and/or helped by a forceps/ventouse delivery
- One twin was born vaginally and the other by caesarean section.
- If the twins are joined at any part of the body – called conjoined twins, delivery is mostly by caesarean section.

=== Fetal monitoring ===
For external monitoring of the fetus during childbirth, a simple pinard stethoscope or doppler fetal monitor ("doptone") can be used. A method of external (noninvasive) fetal monitoring (EFM) during childbirth is cardiotocography (CTG), using a cardiotocograph that consists of two sensors: The heart (cardio) sensor is an ultrasonic sensor, similar to a Doppler fetal monitor, that continuously emits ultrasound and detects motion of the fetal heart by the characteristic of the reflected sound. The pressure-sensitive contraction transducer, called a tocodynamometer (toco), has a flat area that is fixed to the skin by a band around the belly. The pressure required to flatten a section of the wall correlates with the internal pressure, thereby providing an estimate of contraction. Monitoring with a cardiotocograph can either be intermittent or continuous. The World Health Organization (WHO) advises that for healthy women undergoing spontaneous labour continuous cardiotocography is not recommended for assessment of fetal well-being. The WHO states: "In countries and settings where continuous CTG is used defensively to protect against litigation, all stakeholders should be made aware that this practice is not evidence-based and does not improve birth outcomes."

A mother's water has to break before internal (invasive) monitoring can be used. More invasive monitoring can involve a fetal scalp electrode to give an additional measure of fetal heart activity, and/or intrauterine pressure catheter (IUPC). It can also involve fetal scalp pH testing.

=== Caesarean section ===
Caesarean section is the removal of the neonate through a surgical incision in the abdomen, rather than through vaginal birth. During the procedure, the patient is usually numbed with an epidural or a spinal block, but general anaesthesia can be used as well. A cut is made in the patient's abdomen and then in the uterus to remove the baby. Before the 1970s, once a woman delivered one baby via C-section, it was recommended that all of her future babies be delivered by C-section, but that recommendation has changed. Unless there is some other indication, mothers can attempt a trial of labour and most can have a vaginal birth after C-section (VBAC). Induced births and elective cesarean before 39 weeks can be harmful to the neonate as well as harmful or without benefit to the mother. Therefore, many guidelines recommend against non-medically required induced births and elective cesarean before 39 weeks.

The WHO recommends a C-section rate of between 10 and 15% because C-section rates higher than 10% are not associated with a decrease in morbidity and mortality. In 2018, a group of medical professionals called the rates of increase around the world "alarming". In a Lancet report, C-sections were found to have more than tripled from about 6% of all births to 21%. In a statement by the maternal and child health organisation, the March of Dimes, the increase is largely due to an increase in elective C-sections rather than when it is really necessary or indicated.

=== Discharge ===
For births that occur in hospitals, the WHO recommends a hospital stay of at least 24 hours following an uncomplicated vaginal delivery and 96 hours for a Cesarean section. Looking at the length of stay (in 2016) for an uncomplicated delivery around the world shows an average of less than 1 day in Egypt to 6 days in (pre-war) Ukraine. Averages for Australia are 2.8 days and 1.5 days in the UK. While this number is low, two-thirds of women in the UK have midwife-assisted births and in some cases the mother may choose a hospital setting for birth to be closer to the wide range of assistance available for an emergency. However, women with midwife care may leave the hospital shortly after birth, and their midwife will continue their care at home. In the U.S., the average length of stay has gradually dropped from 4.1 days in 1970 to a current stay of 2 days. The CDC attributed the drop to the rise in health care costs, saying people could not afford to stay in the hospital any longer. To keep it from dropping any lower, in 1996 Congress passed the Newborns' and Mothers' Health Protection Act that requires insurers to cover at least 48 hours for uncomplicated delivery.

== Complications ==
=== Labour and delivery complications ===
==== Obstructed labour ====
Obstructed labour, also called "dysfunctional labour" or "labour dystocia", is difficult labour or abnormally slow progress of labour, involving progressive cervical dilatation or lack of descent of the fetus. The second stage of labour may be delayed or lengthy due to poor or uncoordinated uterine action, an abnormal uterine position such as breech or shoulder dystocia, and cephalopelvic disproportion (a small pelvis or large infant). Prolonged labour may result in maternal exhaustion, fetal distress, and other complications including obstetric fistula.

==== Eclampsia ====
Eclampsia is the onset of seizures (convulsions) in a woman with pre-eclampsia. Pre-eclampsia is a disorder of pregnancy in which there is high blood pressure and either large amounts of protein in the urine or other organ dysfunction. Pre-eclampsia is routinely screened for during prenatal care. Onset may be before, during, or rarely, after delivery. Around 1% of women with eclampsia die.

=== Maternal complications ===
A puerperal disorder or postpartum disorder is a complication that presents primarily during the puerperium, or postpartum period. The postpartum period can be divided into three distinct stages: the initial or acute phase, six to 12 hours after childbirth; the subacute postpartum period, which lasts two to six weeks; and the delayed postpartum period, which can last up to six months. In the subacute postpartum period, 87% to 94% of women report at least one health problem. Long-term health problems (persisting after the delayed postpartum period) are reported by 31% of women.

==== Postpartum bleeding ====
Bleeding (haemorrhage) is the leading cause of maternal death worldwide, accounting for approximately 27.1% of maternal deaths. Within maternal deaths due to haemorrhage, two-thirds are caused by postpartum haemorrhage. The causes of postpartum haemorrhage can be separated into four main categories: tone, trauma, tissue, and thrombin. Tone represents uterine atony, the failure of the uterus to contract adequately following delivery. Trauma includes lacerations or uterine rupture. Tissue includes conditions that can lead to a retained placenta. Thrombin, which is a molecule used in the human body's blood clotting system, represents all coagulopathies.

==== Postpartum infections ====
Postpartum infections, also historically known as childbed fever and medically as puerperal fever, are any bacterial infections of the reproductive tract following childbirth or miscarriage. Signs and symptoms usually include a fever greater than 38.0 °C (100.4 °F), chills, lower abdominal pain, and possibly bad-smelling vaginal discharge. The infection usually occurs after the first 24 hours and within the first ten days following delivery. Infection remains a major cause of maternal deaths and morbidity in the developing world.

==== Psychological complications ====
Childbirth can be an intense event, and strong emotions, both positive and negative, can be brought to the surface. Abnormal and persistent fear of childbirth is known as tokophobia. The prevalence of fear of childbirth around the world ranges between 4–25%, with 3–7% of pregnant women having clinical fear of childbirth. Although pain may be seen as a self-evident and indisputable fact, in reality, pain is only one sensation of childbirth. There are many other sensations, such as bliss, joy, and satisfaction, which can be more powerful than pain. Negative expectations can actually increase sensitivity to pain through the process of nocebo hyperalgesia. At the same time positive expectations can reduce pain through placebo analgesia.

Most new mothers may experience mild feelings of unhappiness and worry after giving birth. Babies require a lot of care, so it is normal for mothers to be worried about or tired from providing that care. The feelings, often termed the "baby blues", affect up to 80% of mothers. They are somewhat mild, last a week or two, and usually go away on their own.

Postpartum depression is different from the "baby blues". With postpartum depression, feelings of sadness and anxiety can be extreme and might interfere with a woman's ability to care for herself or her family. Because of the severity of the symptoms, postpartum depression usually requires treatment. The condition, which occurs in nearly 15% of births, may begin shortly before or any time after childbirth, but commonly begins between a week and a month after delivery.

Childbirth-related post-traumatic stress disorder is a psychological disorder that can develop in women who have recently given birth. Causes include issues such as an emergency C-section, preterm labour, inadequate care during labour, lack of social support following childbirth, and others. Examples of symptoms include intrusive symptoms, flashbacks and nightmares, as well as symptoms of avoidance (including amnesia for the whole or parts of the event), problems in developing a mother-child attachment, and others similar to those commonly experienced in posttraumatic stress disorder (PTSD). Many women who are experiencing symptoms of PTSD after childbirth are misdiagnosed with postpartum depression or adjustment disorders. These diagnoses can lead to inadequate treatment.

Postpartum psychosis is a rare psychiatric emergency in which symptoms of high mood and racing thoughts (mania), depression, severe confusion, loss of inhibition, paranoia, hallucinations, and delusions set in, beginning suddenly in the first two weeks after childbirth. The symptoms vary and can change quickly. It usually requires hospitalisation. The most severe symptoms last from two to 12 weeks, and recovery takes six months to a year.

=== Fetal complications ===
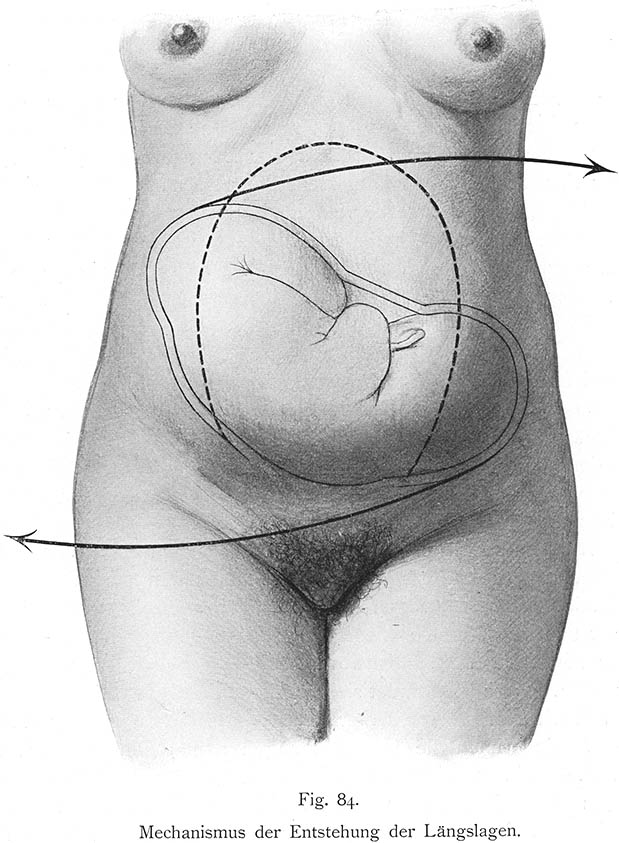
Mechanical fetal injury may be caused by improper rotation of the fetus.

Five causes make up about 80% of newborn deaths globally: prematurity, low-birth-weight, infections, lack of oxygen at birth, and trauma during birth.

==== Stillbirth ====
Stillbirth is typically defined as fetal death at or after 20 to 28 weeks of pregnancy. It results in a baby born without signs of life.

Worldwide prevention of most stillbirths is possible with improved health systems. About half of stillbirths occur during childbirth, and stillbirth is more common in the developing than developed world. Otherwise depending on how far along the pregnancy is, medications may be used to start labour or a type of surgery known as dilation and evacuation may be carried out. Following a stillbirth, women are at higher risk of another one; however, most subsequent pregnancies do not have similar problems.

Worldwide, in 2019, there were about 2 million stillbirths that occurred after 28 weeks of pregnancy; this equates to 1 in 72 total births or one every 16 seconds. Still births are more common in South Asia and Sub-Saharan Africa. Stillbirth rates have declined, though more slowly since the 2000s.

==== Preterm birth ====
Preterm birth is the birth of an infant at fewer than 37 weeks gestational age. Globally, about 15 million infants were born before 37 weeks of gestation. Premature birth is the leading cause of death in children under five years of age, though many who survive experience disabilities, including learning defects and visual and hearing problems. Causes for early birth may be unknown or may be related to certain chronic conditions such as diabetes, infections, and other known causes. The World Health Organization has developed guidelines with recommendations to improve the chances of survival and health outcomes for preterm infants.

If a pregnant woman enters preterm labour, delivery can be delayed by giving medications called tocolytics. Tocolytics delay labour by inhibiting contractions of the uterine muscles that progress labour. The most widely used tocolytics include beta agonists, calcium channel blockers, and magnesium sulfate. The goal of administering tocolytics is not to delay delivery to the point that the child can be delivered at term, but instead to postpone delivery long enough for the administration of glucocorticoids, which can help the fetal lungs to mature enough to reduce morbidity and mortality from infant respiratory distress syndrome.

==== Post-term birth ====
The term postterm pregnancy is used to describe a condition in which a woman has not yet delivered her baby after 42 weeks of gestation, two weeks beyond the usual 40-week duration of pregnancy. Postmature births carry risks for both the mother and the baby, including meconium aspiration syndrome, fetal malnutrition, and stillbirths. The placenta, which supplies the baby with oxygen and nutrients, begins to age and will eventually fail after the 42nd week of gestation. Induced labour is indicated for postterm pregnancy.

==== Neonatal infection ====
Disability-adjusted life year for neonatal infections and other (perinatal) conditions per 100,000 inhabitants in 2004. Excludes prematurity and low birth weight, birth asphyxia, and birth trauma, which have their own maps/data. no data less than 150 150–300 300–450 450–600 600–750 750–900 900–1050 1050–1200 1200–1350 1350–1500 1500–1850 more than 1850

Newborns are prone to infection in the first month of life. The pathogenic bacterium Streptococcus agalactiae (a group B streptococcus) is most often the cause of these occasionally fatal infections. The baby contracts the infection from the mother during labour. In 2014, it was estimated that about one in 2000 newborn babies had a group B streptococcus infection within the first week of life, usually evident as respiratory disease, general sepsis, or meningitis.

Untreated sexually transmitted infections (STIs) are associated with birth defects, and infections in newborn babies, particularly in areas where rates of infection remain high. The majority of STIs have no symptoms or only mild symptoms that may not be recognised. Mortality rates resulting from some infections may be high, for example the overall perinatal mortality rate associated with untreated syphilis is 30%.

==== Perinatal asphyxia ====
Perinatal asphyxia is the medical condition resulting from deprivation of oxygen to a newborn infant that lasts long enough during the birth process to cause physical harm. Hypoxic damage can also occur to most of the infant's organs (heart, lungs, liver, gut, kidneys), but brain damage is of most concern and perhaps the least likely to quickly or completely heal. Oxygen deprivation can lead to permanent disabilities in the child, such as cerebral palsy.

==== Mechanical fetal injury ====
Risk factors for fetal birth injury include fetal macrosomia (big baby), maternal obesity, the need for instrumental delivery, and an inexperienced attendant. Specific situations that can contribute to birth injury include breech presentation and shoulder dystocia. Most fetal birth injuries resolve without long term harm, but brachial plexus injury may lead to Erb's palsy or Klumpke's paralysis.

== Mortality ==
=== Maternal mortality ===
Interactive graph of maternal mortality over time

Causes for maternal mortality range from severe bleeding to obstructed labour, for which there are highly effective interventions.

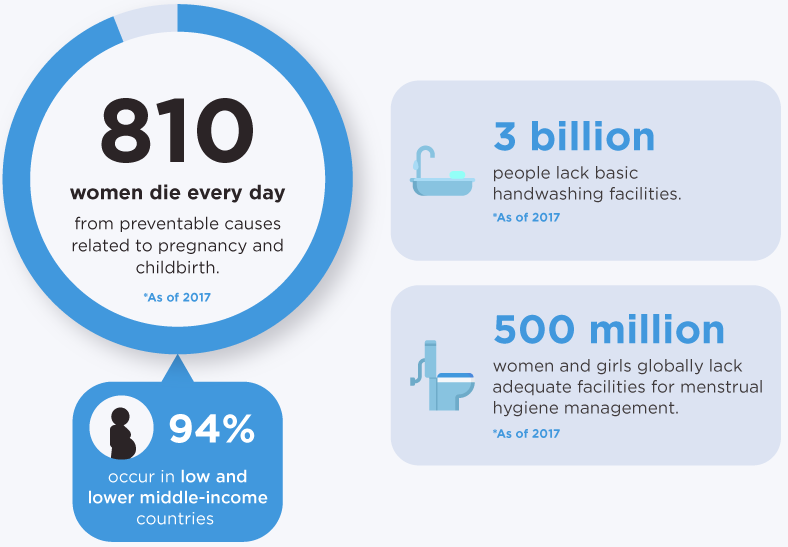
810 women die every day from preventable causes related to pregnancy and childbirth. 94% occur in low and lower-middle-income countries.

In 2008, at least seven million mothers experienced serious health problems, while 50 million more had adverse health consequences after childbirth.

The United Nations Population Fund estimated that 303,000 women died of pregnancy or childbirth-related causes in 2015.

Additionally, postpartum infections, most often transmitted by the dirty hands and tools of doctors, used to be one of the main causes of maternal mortality until germ theory was accepted in the mid-1800s and adopted thereafter. Before that, it was assumed that puerperal fever was caused by a variety of sources, including the leakage of breast milk into the body and anxiety. Still, home births facilitated by trained midwives produced the best outcomes from 1880 to 1930 in the US and Europe, whereas physician-facilitated hospital births produced the worst. When antibiotics were discovered in the 1930s, rates of puerperal fever started to decrease significantly.

The change in trend of maternal mortality can be attributed to the widespread use of antibiotics along with the progression of medical technology, more extensive physician training, and less medical interference with normal deliveries.

The World Health Organization (WHO) has urged midwife training to strengthen maternal and newborn health services. To support the upgrading of midwifery skills, the WHO established a midwife training programme, Action for Safe Motherhood.

There was a 44% decline in the maternal death rate between 1990 and 2015. However, 830 women died every day in 2015 from causes related to pregnancy or childbirth, and for every woman who dies, 20 or 30 encounter injuries, infections, or disabilities. Most of these deaths and injuries are preventable. In the decades since 1990 the global maternal mortality ratio has fallen from 385 maternal deaths per 100,000 live births in 1990 to 216 deaths per 100,000 live births in 2015, and it was reported in 2017 that many countries had halved their maternal death rates in the last 10 years, as women have gained access to family planning and skilled birth attendants with backup emergency obstetric care.

==== United States ====
Since the US began recording childbirth statistics in 1915, the US has had historically poor maternal mortality rates in comparison to other developed countries.

The rising maternal death rate in the US is of concern. In 1990, the US ranked 12th of the 14 developed countries that were analysed. However, since that time, the rates of every country have steadily continued to improve, while the US rate has spiked dramatically. While every other developed nation of the 14 analysed in 1990 shows a 2017 death rate of less than 10 deaths per 100,000 live births, the US rate has risen to 26.4. By comparison, the United Kingdom ranks second highest at 9.2 and Finland is the safest at 3.8.

In 2022, the WHO reported that the US had the highest maternal death rate of any developed nation while other nations continued to experience declines. The death rate of black women has also continued to climb with a 2020 CDC report showing the maternal death rate at 55.3 deaths per 100,000 live births – 2.9 times the rate for white women. In 2023, a study reported that deaths among Native American women were even higher, at 3.5 times the rate for White women. The report attributed the high rate in part to the fact that Native American women are cared for under a poorly funded Federal Health Care System that is so stretched that the average monthly visit lasts only from three to seven minutes. Such a short visit allows neither time for performing an adequate health assessment nor time for the patient to discuss any problems she may be experiencing.

=== Infant mortality ===
Looking at 168 countries around the world, a 2015 Save the Children report found that each day about 8,000 newborns die during the first month of life. Worldwide, more than 1 million babies die during their first day, even though simple measures such as antibiotics, hand-held breathing masks, and other simple interventions could prevent the deaths of 70% of infants.

The United States had the highest first-day infant death rate of all the industrialised nations in the world. In the US, each year, about 11,300 newborns die within 24 hours of their birth, 50% more first-day deaths than all other industrialised countries combined.

== Accommodation ==
=== Location ===
Childbirth routinely occurs in hospitals in many developed countries. Before the 20th century and in some countries to the present day, such as the Netherlands, it has more typically occurred at home.

In rural and remote communities of many countries, hospitalised childbirth may not be readily available or the best option. Maternal evacuation is the predominant risk management method for assisting mothers in these communities. Maternal evacuation is the process of relocating pregnant women in remote communities to deliver their babies in a nearby urban hospital setting. This practice is common in Indigenous Inuit and Northern Manitoban communities in Canada as well as Australian aboriginal communities. Maternal evacuation, due to a lack of social support provided to these women, can have negative effects on mothers. These negative effects include an increase in maternal newborn complications and postpartum depression, and decreased breastfeeding rates.

The exact location in which childbirth takes place is an important factor in determining nationality, in particular for birth aboard aircraft and ships.

=== Hospitals ===
==== Baby Friendly Hospitals ====
In 1991, the World Health Organization (WHO) launched a global programme, the Baby Friendly Hospital Initiative (BFHI), that urges birthing centres and hospitals to institute procedures that encourage mother/baby bonding and breastfeeding. The Johns Hopkins Hospital describes the process of receiving the Baby Friendly designation:

It involves changing long-standing policies, protocols, and behaviors. The Baby-Friendly Hospital Initiative includes a very rigorous credentialing process that includes a two-day site visit, where assessors evaluate policies, community partnerships and education plans, as well as interview patients, physicians and staff members.

Every major health organisation, such as the CDC, supports the BFHI. As of 2019, 28% of hospitals in the US have been accredited by the WHO.

=== Facilities ===
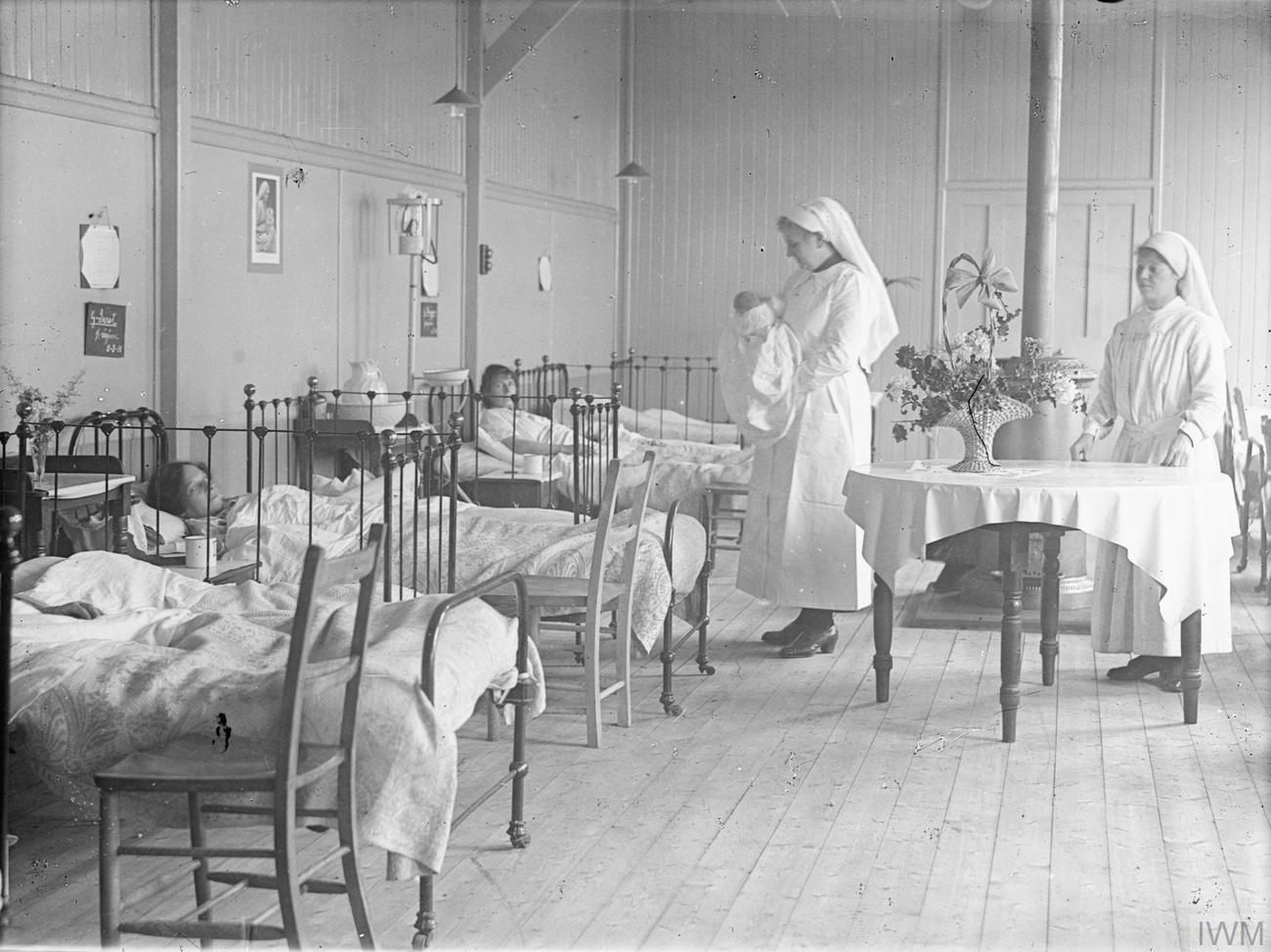
A maternity ward in Britain, 1918

Facilities for childbirth include:

- A maternity ward, also called maternity unit, labour ward or delivery ward, is generally a hospital department that provides health care to women and their children during childbirth. It is generally closely linked to the hospital's neonatal intensive care unit and/or obstetric surgery unit if present. It usually includes facilities both for childbirth and for postpartum rest and observation of mothers in normal as well as complicated cases.
- A maternity hospital is a hospital that specialises in caring for women while they are pregnant and during childbirth, and provides care for newborn babies,
- A birthing centre is a midwife-led unit that generally presents a more home-like environment. Birthing centres may be located on hospital grounds or "free-standing" (that is, not affiliated with a hospital).
- A home birth is usually accomplished with the assistance of a midwife. Some women choose to give birth at home without any professionals present, termed an unassisted childbirth.

=== Associated occupations ===
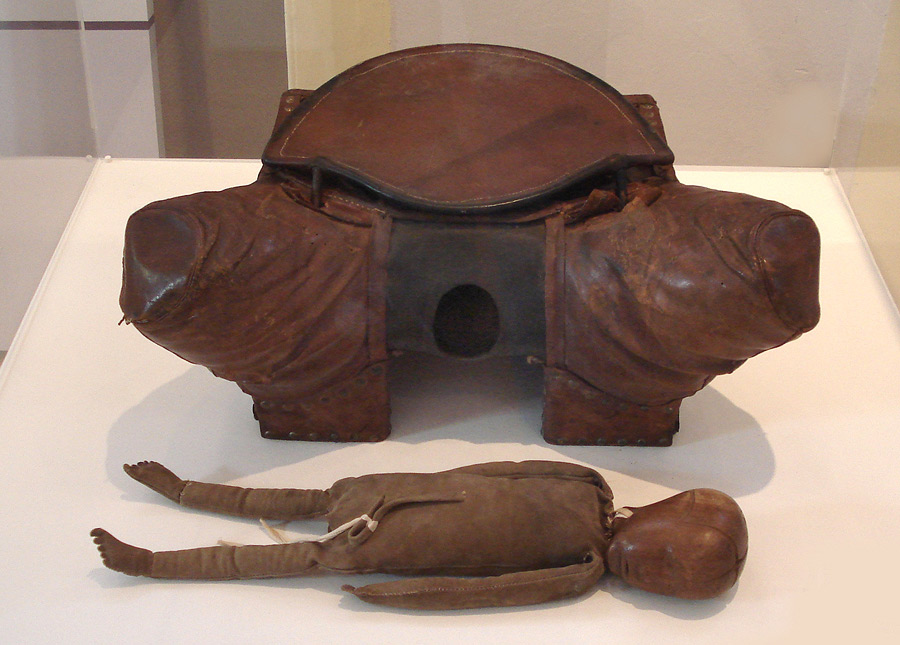
Model of pelvis used in the beginning of the 19th century to teach technical procedures for a successful childbirth. Museum of the History of Medicine, Porto Alegre, Brazil

Medical doctors who practise in the field of childbirth include categorically specialised obstetricians, family practitioners and general practitioners whose training, skills and practices include obstetrics, and in some contexts general surgeons. These physicians and surgeons provide care across the whole spectrum of normal and abnormal births and pathological labour conditions. Categorically specialised obstetricians are qualified surgeons, so they can undertake surgical procedures relating to childbirth. Some family practitioners or general practitioners also perform obstetrical surgery. Obstetrical procedures include cesarean sections, episiotomies, and assisted delivery. Categorical specialists in obstetrics are commonly trained in both obstetrics and gynaecology (OB/GYN) and may provide other medical and surgical gynaecological care, and may incorporate more general, well-woman, primary care elements in their practices. Maternal–fetal medicine specialists are obstetrician/gynaecologists subspecialised in managing and treating high-risk pregnancy and delivery.

Anaesthetists or anaesthetists are medical doctors who specialise in pain relief and the use of drugs to facilitate surgery and other painful procedures. They may contribute to the care of a woman in labour by performing an epidural or by providing anaesthesia (often spinal anaesthesia) for Cesarean section or forceps delivery. They are experts in pain management during childbirth.

Obstetric nurses assist midwives, doctors, women, and babies before, during, and after the birth process, in the hospital system. They hold various nursing certifications and typically undergo additional obstetric training in addition to standard nursing training.

Paramedics are healthcare providers who can provide emergency care to both the mother and infant during and after delivery using a wide range of medications and tools on an ambulance. They are capable of delivering babies but can do very little for infants that become "stuck" and are unable to be delivered vaginally.

Lactation consultants assist the mother and newborn to breastfeed successfully. A health visitor comes to see the mother and baby at home, usually within 24 hours of discharge, and checks the infant's adaptation to extrauterine life and the mother's postpartum physiological changes.

==== Birth attendants ====
Different categories of birth attendants may provide support and care during pregnancy and childbirth, although there are important differences across categories based on professional training and skills, practice regulations, and the nature of care delivered. Many of these occupations are highly professionalised, but other roles exist on a less formal basis.

Midwives are autonomous practitioners who provide basic and emergency health care before, during, and after pregnancy and childbirth, generally to women with low-risk pregnancies. Midwives are trained to assist during labour and birth, either through direct-entry or nurse-midwifery education programmes. Jurisdictions where midwifery is a regulated profession will typically have a registering and disciplinary body for quality control, such as the American Midwifery Certification Board in the United States, the College of Midwives of British Columbia in Canada or the Nursing and Midwifery Council in the United Kingdom.

In the past, midwifery played a crucial role in childbirth throughout most indigenous societies. Although western civilisations attempted to assimilate their birthing technologies into certain indigenous societies, like Turtle Island, and get rid of the midwifery, the National Aboriginal Council of Midwives brought back the cultural ideas and midwifery that were once associated with indigenous birthing.

In jurisdictions where midwifery is not a regulated profession, traditional birth attendants, also known as traditional or lay midwives, may assist women during childbirth, although they do not typically receive formal health care education and training.

Childbirth educators are instructors who aim to teach pregnant women and their partners about the nature of pregnancy, labour signs and stages, techniques for giving birth, breastfeeding, and newborn baby care. Training for this role can be found in hospital settings or through independent certifying organisations. Each organisation teaches its own curriculum, and each emphasises different techniques. The Lamaze technique is one well-known example.

Doulas are assistants who support mothers during pregnancy, labour, birth, and postpartum. They are not medical attendants; rather, they provide emotional support and non-medical pain relief for women during labour. Like childbirth educators and other unlicensed assistive personnel, certification to become a doula is not compulsory; thus, anyone can call themself a doula or a childbirth educator.

Confinement nannies are individuals who are employed to provide assistance and stay with the mothers at their home after childbirth. They are usually experienced mothers who have taken courses on how to take care of mothers and newborn babies.

=== Role of males ===
Both preterm and full-term infants benefit from skin-to-skin contact, sometimes called kangaroo care, immediately following birth and for the first few weeks of life. Some fathers have begun to hold their newborns skin to skin; the new baby is familiar with the father's voice, and it is believed that contact with the father helps the infant to stabilise and promotes father-to-infant bonding. Looking at recent studies, a 2019 review found that the level of oxytocin was found to increase not only in mothers who had experienced early skin-to-skin attachment with their infants but in the fathers as well, suggesting a neurobiological connection. If the infant's mother had a caesarean birth, the father can hold their baby in skin-to-skin contact while the mother recovers from the anaesthetic.

Share of births attended by skilled health staff

== Society and culture ==
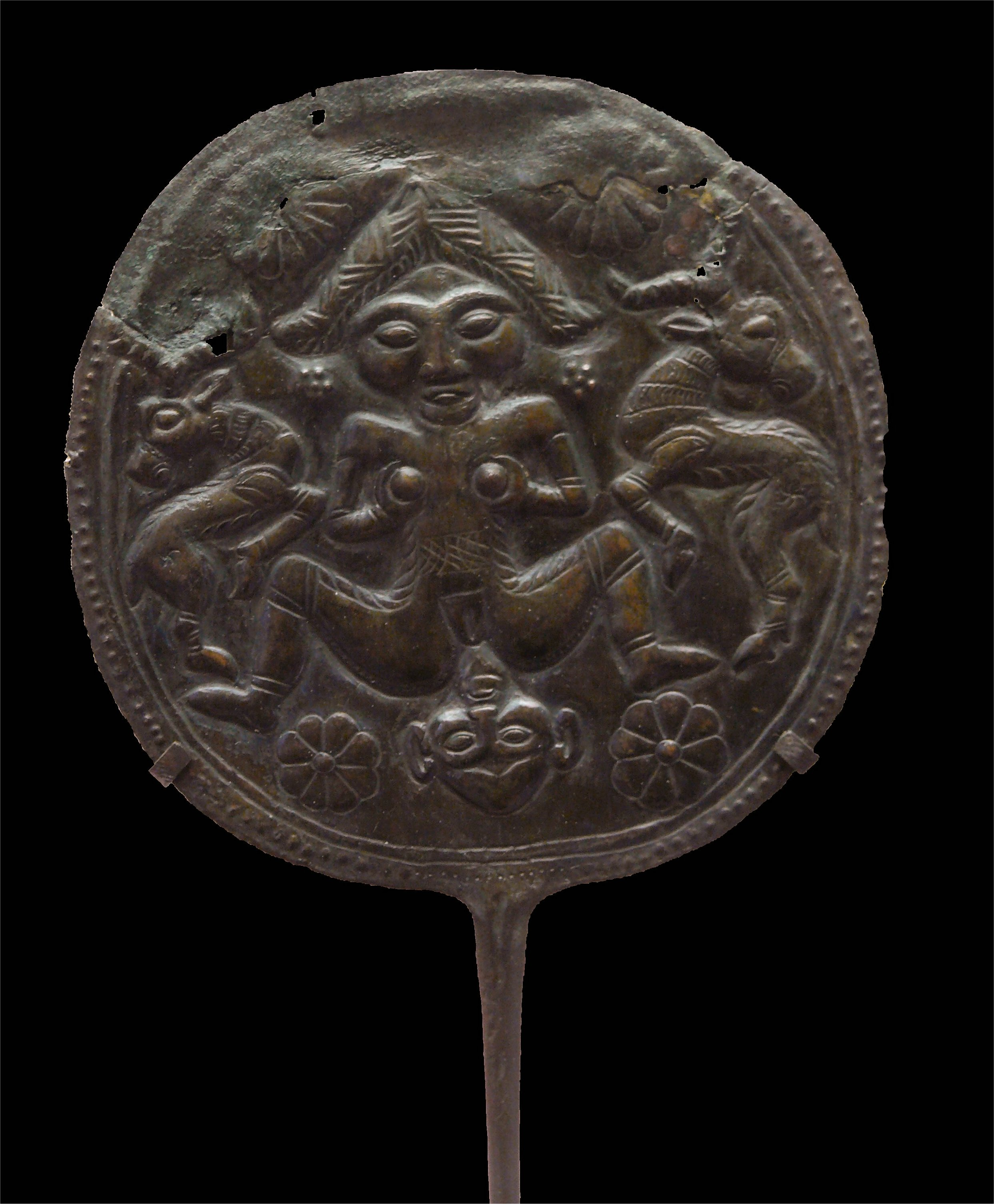
A Luristan bronze fibula showing a woman giving birth between two antelopes, ornamented with flowers. From Iran, 1000 to 650 BC, at the Louvre museum.

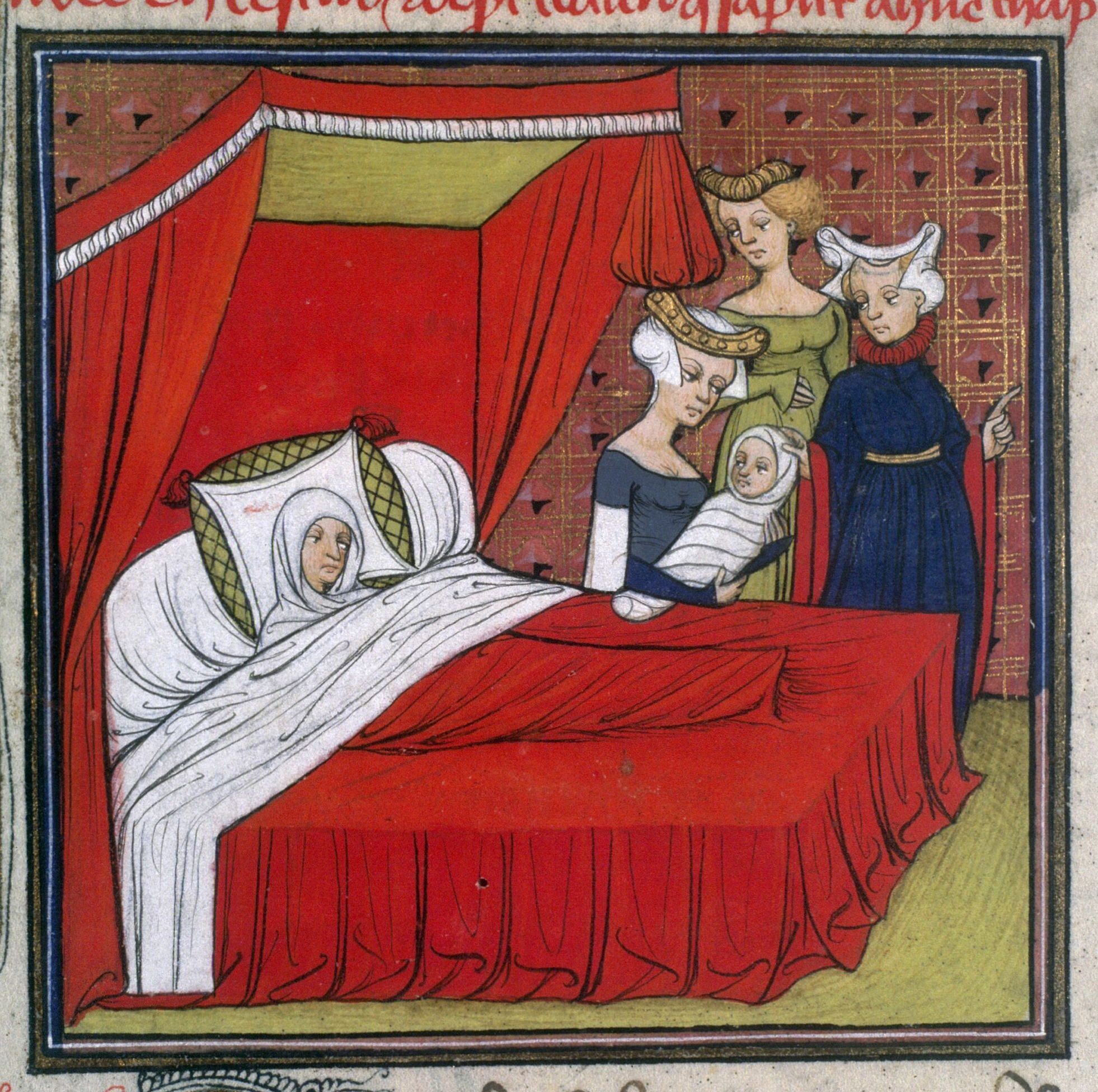
Medieval woman, having given birth, enjoying her lying-in (postpartum confinement). France, 14th century.

Some communities rely heavily on religion for their birthing practices. It is believed that if certain acts are carried out, then it will allow the child a healthier and happier future. One example of this is the belief in the Chillihuani that if a knife or scissors are used for cutting the umbilical cord, it will cause the child to go through clothes very quickly. To prevent this, a jagged ceramic tile is used to cut the umbilical cord.

Comfort and proximity to extended family and social support systems may be a childbirth priority of many communities in developing countries, such as the Chillihuani in Peru and the Mayan town of San Pedro La Laguna. Home births can help women in these cultures feel more comfortable as they are in their own home with their family around them helping out in different ways. Traditionally, it has been rare in these cultures for the mother to lie down during childbirth, opting instead for standing, kneeling, or walking around before and during birthing.

In contemporary Mayan societies, ceremonial gifts are presented to the mother throughout pregnancy and childbirth to help her through the beginning of her child's life. Maya women who work in agricultural fields of some rural communities will usually continue to work in a similar function to how they normally would throughout pregnancy, in some cases working until labour begins.

=== Placentophagy ===
In some cultures, the placenta may be consumed as a nutritional boost, but it may also be seen as a special part of birth and eaten by the newborn's family ceremonially. In the developed world the placenta may be eaten believing that it reduces postpartum bleeding, increases milk supply, provides micronutrients such as iron, and improves mood and boosts energy. The CDC advises against this practice, saying it has not been shown to promote health but has been shown to possibly transmit disease organisms that were passed from the placenta into the mother's breastmilk and then infect the baby.

=== Variation ===
Cultural values, assumptions, and practices of pregnancy and childbirth vary across cultures and time. See:

- Childbirth in Benin
- Childbirth in China
- Childbirth in Ghana
- Childbirth in Haiti
- Childbirth in India
- Childbirth in Iraq
- Childbirth in Japan
- Childbirth in Mexico
- Childbirth in Nepal
- Childbirth in Sri Lanka
- Childbirth in Thailand
- Childbirth in Trinidad and Tobago
- Childbirth in Zambia

=== Costs ===
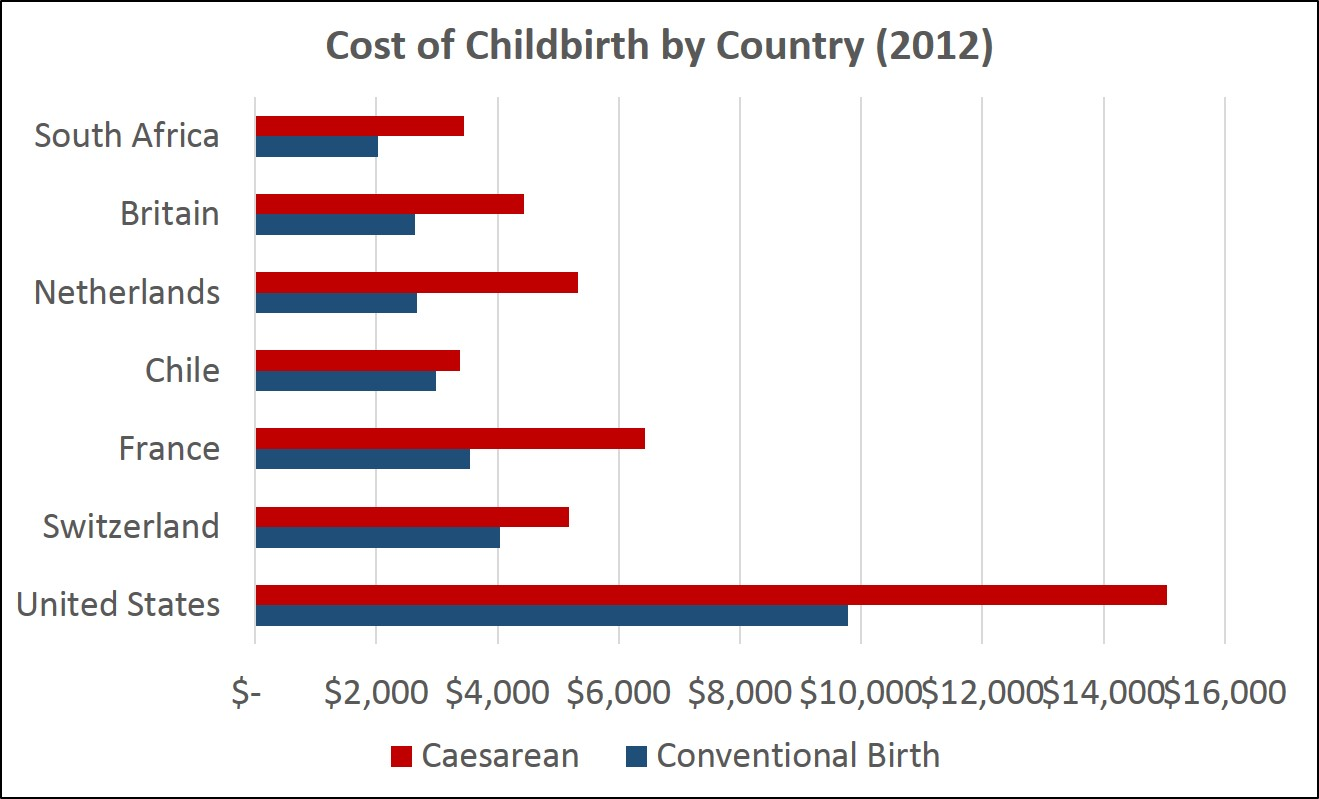
Cost of childbirth in several countries in 2012

The cost of childbirth varies dramatically by country.

According to a 2013 analysis, in the United States, the average amount actually paid by insurance companies or other payers in 2012 averaged $9,775 for an uncomplicated conventional delivery and $15,041 for a caesarean birth. A 2013 study found varying costs by facility for childbirth expenses in California, varying from $3,296 to $37,227 for a vaginal birth and from $8,312 to $70,908 for a caesarean birth.

Reporting on costs in 2023, Forbes gave an average cost of $18,865 ($14,768 for vaginal and $26,280 for cesarean) which included pregnancy, delivery, and postpartum care. However, many factors determined the costs, including where the woman lived, the type of birth, and whether or not they had insurance. Even with insurance, average out-of-pocket expenses for a vaginal delivery were $2,655 and $3,214 for a cesarean birth. Variables that determined charges included length of hospital stay, which averaged 48 hours for vaginal birth and 96 hours for a cesarean. There could be charges for any complications before or after the birth, for example, an induced labour costs more than a spontaneous birth. Babies that had a difficult birth may need special tests and monitoring, adding to the costs of childbirth.

Beginning in 2014, the National Institute for Health and Care Excellence began recommending that women with low-risk pregnancies give birth at home under the care of a midwife rather than an obstetrician, citing lower expenses and better healthcare outcomes. The median cost associated with home birth was estimated to be about $1,500 vs. about $2,500 in hospital.

== Research directions ==
It is currently possible to collect two types of stem cells during childbirth: amniotic stem cells and umbilical cord blood stem cells. They are being studied as possible treatments of a number of conditions.

== History ==
=== Talismanic items ===
Historically, most women gave birth at home without emergency medical care available. In Medieval England, spiritual charms or talismanic items, such as birthing girdles inscribed with prayers to St Quiricus and Saint Julitta and invocations for safe delivery, could be worn during labour. References to the Virgin Mary are common and the girdling tradition may have been inspired by relics purporting to be the Virgin's girdle. During the Reformation, birthing girdles were repeatedly banned by bishops, but women were known to have used them secretly until the early 17th-century.

=== Giving birth in hospitals ===
In the early days of hospitalisation for childbirth, a 17th-century maternity ward in Paris was incredibly congested, with up to five pregnant women sharing one bed. At this hospital, one in five women died during the birthing process. At the onset of the Industrial Revolution, giving birth at home became more difficult due to congested living spaces and dirty living conditions. That drove urban and lower-class women to newly available hospitals, while wealthy and middle-class women continued to labour at home. Consequently, wealthier women experienced lower maternal mortality rates than those of a lower social class. Throughout the 1900s, there was an increasing availability of hospitals, and more women began going into the hospital for labour and delivery. In the United States, 5% of women gave birth in hospitals in 1900. By 1930, 50% of all women and 75% of urban-dwelling women delivered in hospitals. By 1960, this number increased to 96%. By the 1970s, home birth rates fell to approximately 1%. In the United States, the middle classes were especially receptive to the medicalisation of childbirth, which promised a safer and less painful labour.

Accompanied by the shift from home to hospital was the shift from midwife to physician. Male physicians began to replace female midwives in Europe and the United States in the 1700s. The rise in status and popularity of this new position was accompanied by a drop in status for midwives. By the 1800s, affluent families were primarily calling male doctors to assist with their deliveries, and female midwives were seen as a resource for women who could not afford better care. That completely removed women from assisting in labour, as only men were eligible to become doctors at the time. Additionally, it privatised the birthing process as family members and friends were often banned from the delivery room.

There was opposition to the change from both progressive feminists and religious conservatives. The feminists were concerned about job security for a role that had traditionally been held by women. The conservatives argued that it was immoral for a woman to be exposed in such a way in front of a man. For that reason, many male obstetricians performed deliveries in dark rooms or with their patient fully covered with a drape.

=== Pain medication in labour ===
The use of pain medication in labour has been a controversial issue for hundreds of years. A Scottish woman was burned at the stake in 1591 for requesting pain relief during the delivery of twins. Medication became more acceptable in 1852, when Queen Victoria used chloroform as pain relief during labour. The use of morphine and scopolamine, also known as "twilight sleep", was first used in Germany and popularised by German physicians Bernard Kronig and Karl Gauss. This concoction offered minor pain relief but mostly allowed women to completely forget the entire delivery process. Under twilight sleep, mothers were often blindfolded and restrained as they experienced the immense pain of childbirth. The cocktail came with severe side effects, such as decreased uterine contractions and altered mental state. Additionally, babies delivered with the use of childbirth drugs often experienced temporary cessation of breathing. The feminist movement in the United States openly and actively supported the use of twilight sleep, which was introduced to the country in 1914. Some physicians, many of whom had been using painkillers for the past fifty years, including opium, cocaine, and quinine, embraced the new drug. Others were hesitant.

=== Cesarean section ===
The proportion of pregnancies delivered by C-section between 1976 and 1996 in the U.S. increased from 6.7% in 1976 to 14.2% in 1996, with maternal choice the most frequent reason given. By 2018 the rate had climbed to one-third of all births.

=== Outdated methods ===
Friedman's Curve, developed in 1955, was for many years used to determine obstructed labour. However, more recent medical research suggests that the Friedman curve may not be applicable anymore.

=== Role of males ===
Historically, women have been attended and supported by other women during labour and birth. Midwife training in European cities began in the 1400s, but rural women were usually assisted by female family or friends. However, it was not simply a ladies' social bonding event as some historians have portrayed – fear and pain often filled the atmosphere, as death during childbirth was a common occurrence. In the United States before the 1950s, a father would not be in the birthing room. It did not matter if it was a home birth; the father would be waiting downstairs or in another room in the home. If it were in a hospital, then the father would wait in the waiting room. Fathers were only permitted in the room if the life of the mother or baby was severely at-risk. In 1522, a German physician was sentenced to death for sneaking into a delivery room dressed as a woman.

The majority of guidebooks related to pregnancy and childbirth were written by men who had never been involved in the birthing process. A Greek physician, Soranus of Ephesus, wrote a book about obstetrics and gynaecology in the second century, which was referenced for the next thousand years. The book contained endless home remedies for pregnancy and childbirth, many of which would be considered heinous by modern women and medical professionals.

=== Childbed fever ===
The work of Ignaz Semmelweis was seminal in the pathophysiology, and treatment of childbed fever (postpartum infection), and his work saved many lives.

== See also ==
- Abuse during childbirth
- Advanced maternal age, when a woman is older at reproduction
- Antinatalism
- Asynclitic birth, an abnormal birth position
- Birth defect
- Childbirth positions
- Coffin birth
- Ferguson reflex
- List of countries by number of births
- Maternal health
- Multiple birth
- Obstetrical bleeding
- Naegele's rule, to calculate the due date for a pregnancy
- Natalism
- Obstetrical dilemma
- Perineal massage
- Pre- and perinatal psychology
- Reproductive Health Supplies Coalition
- Unassisted childbirth
- Vernix caseosa and lanugo

Natural birth topics:

- Bradley method of natural childbirth
- Lamaze
- Natural childbirth
- Water birth
