= Back labor =

Discomfort in the lower back during childbirth

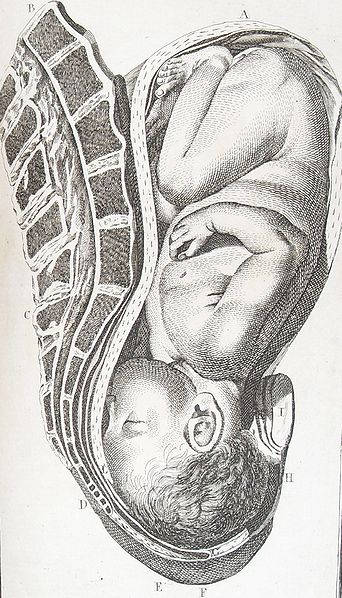
Normal fetal position (occiput anterior); back labour may occur if the fetus faces the opposite direction (occiput posterior).

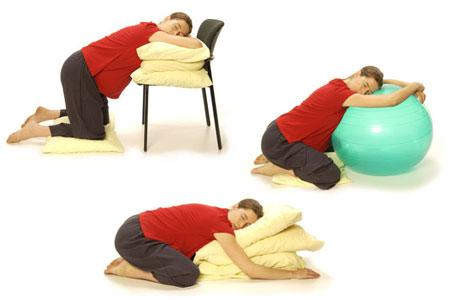
Back labor can be painful. Relief may be sought by trying to find a comfortable position or using a birth ball.

Back labor (less commonly called posterior labor) is a term referring to sensations of pain or discomfort in the lower back, just above the tailbone, experienced by a mother during childbirth.

Back labor may be noted when the baby is face up in the birth canal (occiput posterior), and not face down, so that the back of the baby's skull (occiput) is pushed against the mother's sacrum. However back labor can also occur when the baby is in a different position. The discomfort is often noted to be intensely painful, and may not completely abate between contractions. Whether back labor will occur cannot be predicted. Reports of how many mothers experience back labor vary, though estimates in the range of 30% are common.

Actions that have been suggested to ameliorate back labor include physical activity, changing positions, back rubbing, water massage, application of hot or cold to the lower back, use of a birthing ball and medication including an epidural. Some research has suggested that injecting sterile water into the lower back may provide pain relief, but there is no consensus that it actually helps.

== See also ==
- Presentation (obstetrics)
