= Intrauterine pressure catheter =

Medical device

An intrauterine pressure catheter (IUPC) is a catheter used during management of labor to measure uterine contractions by taking into account intrauterine pressure and contraction frequency, duration, and strength. This is mainly of use for an obstetrician or midwife who wants to determine the amount of oxytocin (labor-inducing medication) to use.

The IUPC measures uterine performance in Montevideo units and is largely praised amongst clinicians because it provides an objective, quantifiable report of uterine performance, without interference by maternal movements. The IUPC may also be used when internal fetal monitoring is used.
