= Postpartum chills =

Shivering after childbirth

Postpartum chills is a physiological response that occurs within two hours of childbirth. It appears as uncontrollable shivering. It is seen in many women after delivery and can be unpleasant. It lasts for a short time. It is thought to be a result of a nervous system response. It may also be related to fluid shifts and the actual strenuous work of labor. It is considered a normal response, and there is no accompanying fever. A fever would indicate an infection. Reassurance is all that is needed, and for the mother to be kept warm. It has been described as a fairly common and normal occurrence. It is thought to be possibly related to the environmental temperature.

== Bibliography ==
- Henry, Norma (2016). RN maternal newborn nursing : review module. Stilwell, KS: Assessment Technologies Institute. ISBN 9781565335691.
