= Newborns' and Mothers' Health Protection Act =

US law

The Newborns' and Mothers' Health Protection Act of 1996 (passed as part of the Departments of Veterans Affairs and Housing and Urban Development, and Independent Agencies Appropriations Act, 1997 Pub. L. 104–204 (text) (PDF)) is a piece of legislation relating to the coverage of maternity by health insurance plans in the United States. It was signed into law on September 26, 1996, and requires plans that offer maternity coverage to pay for at least a 48-hour hospital stay following childbirth (96-hour stay in the case of a cesarean section).

== Provisions of the Act ==
This law was effective for group health plans for plan years beginning on or after January 1, 1998.

On October 27, 1998, the Department of Labor, in conjunction with the Departments of the US Treasury and Health and Human Services, published interim regulations clarifying issues arising under the Newborns' Act. The changes made by the regulations are effective for group health plans for plan years beginning on or after January 1, 1999.

The Act and its regulations provide that health plans and insurance issuers may not restrict a mother's or newborn's benefits for a hospital length of stay that is connected to childbirth to less than 48 hours following a vaginal delivery or 96 hours following a delivery by cesarean section. However, the attending medical provider (who may be a physician or nurse-midwife) may decide, after consulting with the mother, to discharge the mother or newborn child earlier. The Act, and its regulations, prohibit incentives (either positive or negative) that could encourage less than the minimum protections under the Act as described above.

A mother cannot be encouraged to accept less than the minimum protections available to her under the Act and an attending provider cannot be induced to discharge a mother or newborn earlier than 48 or 96 hours after delivery. The type of coverage provided by the plan (insured or self-insured) and state law will determine whether the Act applies to a mother's or newborn's coverage. The Act provisions always apply to coverage that is self-insured. All group health plans that provide maternity or newborn infant coverage must include a statement in their summary plan description (SPD) advising individuals of the Act's requirements.
