= Childbirth in Iraq =

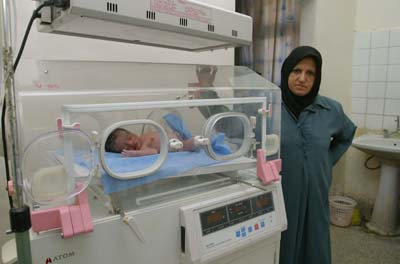
El Tahril el Aam (General Liberation Hospital), Basrah

Childbirth in Iraq is marked by a fertility rate of 4.0 births per woman, a contested but high maternal mortality rate and a moderately high infant mortality rate.

== Fertility rate ==
In 2015 Iraq's fertility rate was reported by the World Health Organization at 4.0 births per woman.

== Mortality ==
=== Maternal mortality ===
Maternal mortality is a much debated figure in Iraq. In 2010 the CIA World Factbook reported maternal mortality at 63 deaths/100,000 births. Iraq's Ministry of Health and the WHO reported in 2011 the maternal mortality rate at 84 death per 100,000 births. That would categorize Iraq as one of the 68 countries that account for 97% of the maternal and child deaths globally. In 2013 the two organizations were divided on the issue with the WHO reporting maternal mortality at 64 deaths per 100,000 and Ministry of Health reporting 25.

=== Infant mortality ===
In 2014 total infant mortality in Iraq was reported 37.53 deaths/1,000 live births: male: 41.57 deaths/1,000 live births and female: 33.28 deaths/1,000 live births.

== Contraceptive use ==
In 2013, the World Health Organization reported the contraception use rate at 53% for the population of Iraq, up from 32.9% in 2010.

== Pregnancy care providers ==
There are three types of pregnancy care providers in Iraq; midwives, obstetricians, and traditional birth attendants. Midwives practice in hospitals and in their home or the home of their client. They are educated in hospital based programs, but there is interest in expanding midwifery education to the university level. Once licensed, a midwife receives a plaque with her license number that she displays outside the door of her home. This lets potential clients know that she has the appropriate credentials. Midwives do not have prescribing privileges but may obtain certain medications from a physician if they are working outside of a hospital. Obstetricians are university educated and work in hospitals. Traditional birth attendants work only in clients homes

== Prenatal care ==
In 2006: 84% of women had at least one prenatal visit with skilled personnel. Of the women who received antenatal care: 63% had a urine sample, 66% had a blood test, and 76% had their blood pressure taken. A client's weight was taken less than the other measurements.

== Labor and birth ==
=== Location ===
In 2011, 74% of recorded births in Iraq took place in a hospital or birth center, 79% of urban births and 67% of rural births.

=== Attendants and support persons ===
In 2011, 89% of births in Iraq were attended by a skilled birth attendant. Sixty percent were attended by a public or private doctor and 28% were attended by a nurse-midwife or certified midwife. Traditional birth attendants, called jiddas, attended 10% of the births. For hospital births, no family members are allowed to accompany the women into the hospital. For a home birth, a women's mother or sister is often present

=== Pain and pain management ===
Women in Iraq generally expect that there will be pain with labor and delivery. An absence of pain is often interpreted as a poor progress in labor. Epidurals are not commonly used in public hospitals in Iraq.

=== Caesarean rate ===
In 2006, 20% of recorded births in Iraq were via Caesarean section. The rate was higher in private hospitals and the likelihood increased with a woman's age and education level

== Post-birth care ==
=== Breastfeeding ===
A recent report found that only 20% of newborns in Iraq are exclusively fed breast milk for the first six months. There is often pressures to switch to formula feeding, though this can be unsafe in a country such as Iraq where clean drinking water is not always available.

=== Female circumcision ===
Female circumcision is controversial in Iraq. While it is not widespread throughout the country, it is still common practice in Iraqi Kurdistan. The decision to perform female circumcision is often made by the mother or grandmother on religious, social, or purity grounds. Negative consequences to the child's health include bleeding, sepsis, shock, psychological disorders, obstetrical complications, and urogenital problems. In 2010 the United Nations released a report that placed the prevalence of female genital mutilation at 78% of women in Kurdistan. A more recent survey of 1,508 women in Kurdistan recorded a prevalence of 23% of women, with the mean age at which it performed being 4.6 years old. Traditionally the procedure is performed at home by a midwife, traditional birth attendant, or relative. In 2011 a law was passed which made female circumcision illegal in Iraqi Kurdistan
