= Childbirth in Sri Lanka =

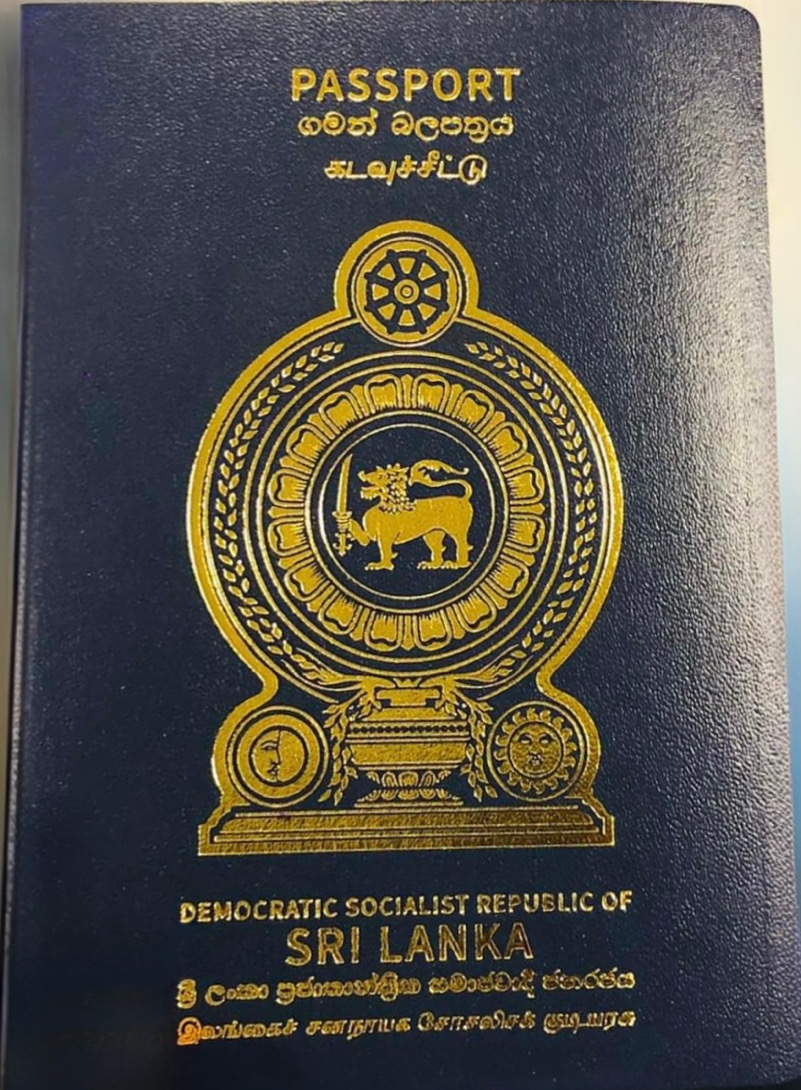
Sri Lankan passport — a document issued to persons with Sri Lankan citizenship.

Issues and practices related to childbirth in Sri Lanka are influenced by the sociocultural composition, political history and violence within the country.

== Background ==
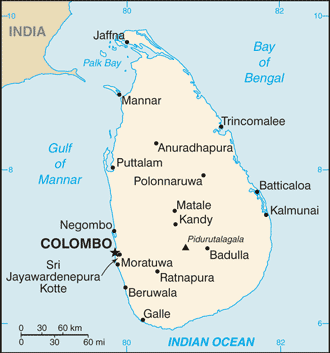
The island-nation of Sri Lanka.

=== Physical environment ===
Sri Lanka is a small island nation in the Indian Ocean, off the southeast coast of India. The island is characterized by a tropical monsoon climate that is divided into the northeast monsoon (December to March) and southwest monsoon (June to October). The terrain is mostly low, flat to rolling fertile plains. Highlands with deep valleys exist in the central-southern interior of the country. Nearly one-third of Sri Lanka's total land mass is covered by natural vegetation; however, much of it has been depleted due to intensive agricultural practices.

=== History ===
The Sinhalese, who likely migrated from India, are first people known to inhabit Sri Lanka. It is commonly believed that they arrived in the 5th century BC. Near 300 BC, there is evidence that Tamil people began to migrate from India to the island now known as Sri Lanka. The Portuguese discovered the island largely by accident in 1505 CE and established their first trading settlement in 1517. The Portuguese briefly controlled the coastal areas of the island, followed by the Dutch in the 17th century. With these colonizers came the introduction of Roman Catholic missionaries who sought to convert Sinhalese and Tamil people to Catholicism. By March 1815, the island was formally united under British rule Throughout the 19th century, the British brought Tamil workers from India to staff the growing number of rubber and tea plantations. The people of the island gained independence from the British in 1948 and formed the nation of Ceylon. The official name was changed to Sri Lanka in 1972, when Buddhism was named the primary religion of the country.

Throughout the late 20th century and into the 21st century, Sri Lanka remained a country wrought with turmoil and war. Increasing Sinhalese nationalism led to disenfranchisement of the Tamil minority. Beginning in 1983 and lasting nearly three decades, brutally violent armed conflicts took place between the separatist Tamil terrorist group, named Liberation Tigers of Tamil Eelam (LTTE), and the Sinhalese dominant Sri Lankan government force. These years were characterized by civil unrest, violence, guerrilla attacks, acts of terrorism and conventional warfare. During the conflict, Northern and Eastern provinces served as primary battlefields. It is estimated that more than 60,000 people were killed in the conflict. A ceasefire was signed in 2002, but mostly ignored and officially rejected by the Sri Lankan government in 2008 due to the continued attacks on civilians by the LTTE. The Sri Lankan government declared victory over the LTTE in May 2009 with the death of the LTTE's leader, Velupillai Prabhakaran.

=== Religion ===
Religion is a vibrant part of Sri Lankan culture. The predominant religions are Buddhism, Hindu, Muslim and Christianity. Buddhism was introduced sometime between 250 and 210 BC, and became the official religion of Sri Lanka in 1972. The 1978 constitution grants primacy to Buddhism, while also ensuring freedom of religion for all citizens. Throughout Sri Lanka's long history, Buddhism has remained an active part of the culture. Nearly 70% of the population is Buddhist. Due to the extensive conflict and war in the northern and eastern provinces, data regarding religious affiliation is variable. The national census states that 8% of the population identified as Muslim, 7% as Hindu, 6% as Christian, and the remaining 10% were unspecified. The majority of Sri Lankan Muslims practice Sunni Islam. Sizable minorities of both Sinhalese and Tamils identify as Christians, most of whom are Roman Catholic.

=== Political system ===
Emblem of Sri Lanka.

Sri Lanka is governed within the framework of a presidential representative democratic republic. In this multi-party system the president is the head of state, head of government and the commander of the armed forces. The long-standing conflict between the majority Sinhalese and the Tamil minority is apparent within the political structure. The president is a member of the socialist capitalist Sri Lanka Freedom Party . The party was founded in 1951, and generally represents the interests of the nationalist Sinhala parties. The current Prime Minister is a member of the conservative United National Party. In 1959, Sri Lanka was led by Sirimavo Bandaranaike, the world's first female chief executive. Mahinda Rajapaksa became president in 2005 and was re-elected in January, 2010, two years before the end of his term. as now he is the leader of the primary opposition party that the socialist capitalist United People's Freedom Alliance.

=== Economic system ===
Sri Lanka's gross domestic product (GDP) per capita is US$4,900 with an annual growth rate estimated at 8%. The average annual income is US$964 and about 6% of the population lives below US$1 per day. In 2001, the country faced bankruptcy when national debt overtook GDP. Crisis was averted when the government gathered international loans after a ceasefire was signed with the LTTE.

In 2009, a third of Sri Lankans worked in agriculture, a fourth in industry and the remainder primarily worked in services jobs. Four percent of males are unemployed. Women are becoming increasingly active in the job market and female unemployment has dropped from 22% in 1993, to 8% in 2009. The primary economic sectors include tourism, textiles, clothing manufacture, agricultural products and exportation of tea, apparel, gemstones and rubber.

=== Social structure and organization ===
In Sri Lanka, there has not been a comprehensive national population census completed since 1981. The 2001 national census did not include vital information from conflict areas of the northern and eastern parts of the country. Due to the ongoing violence in Sri Lanka, most demographic data available is estimated based on 1981 or 2001 data, and variation exists among data sources. The CIA World Factbook lists Sri Lanka's current population as 20,653,913 persons. Considering the island is only 65,610 square kilometers (25,330 sq mi), it is a very densely populated nation. Over 85% of the population live in non-urban environments. The largest city is Colombo, with a population of 1,819,777. Sri Lanka is occupied by several ethnic groups. The Sinhalese are the predominant ethnic group (74%), followed by Sri Lankan Tamils (13%), Indian Tamils (5%) and Moors (Muslim) (7%). Sinhala is the national language and is the predominant language spoken by 74% of the population. Most Tamils and Moors speak Tamil, part of the South Indian linguistic group. Due to the extensive conflict between Sri Lankan government and Tamil separatists that took place in the late 20th and early 21st centuries, several hundred thousand Tamil citizens fled their homes in conflict zones and were placed in government run camps for internally displaced persons (IDPs), or sought refuge in other countries. The total number of displaced persons is unknown, though in 1994 it was estimated over 500,000 people were displaced internally and more than 200,000 people fled internationally.

Since 2009, considerable effort has been made to relocate the hundreds of thousand IDPs from government camps. When forced to flee conflict zones, most IDPs left behind their homes, assets, and tools necessary for their livelihoods. The Sri Lankan government reported that rations were provided for families selected for resettlement from IDP camps. These rations included agricultural tool kits, dry rations, an initial payment of Rs. 5,000 (est. US$44), a shelter grant of Rs. 25,000 (est. US$219), roofing sheets, provision of rice seed, fertilizer and transportation. Even in resettled communities, many people continue to face insecurity and poverty. As of February 2011, nearly 17,500 people continue to live at Menik Farm, Sri Lanka's largest camp for IDPs. Recent reports claim that the government hopes to resettle all conflict-displaced people by the end of 2011. Rebuilding infrastructure in northern and eastern provinces affected by war is an ongoing task.

=== Education ===
Sri Lanka's education system is state funded, and offered free of charge at all levels, including the university level. Schooling is compulsory for children from 5 to 13 years of age. The national literacy rate is 91%. The reported literacy rate of the urban population is 93%, 92% of the rural population and 75% of the estate population. The literacy rate among women is 89%. Nearly 70% of the population is educated beyond the 9th grade.

== Health Information ==
Considering the low annual income and many years of internal conflict, Sri Lanka's health indicators are stronger than those of many other developing countries. According to the Kaiser Family Foundation's Global Health Database, 90% of Sri Lankans have access to water and 91% have access to sanitation. An estimated 2,800 people are living with HIV/AIDS, and 20,000 are living with tuberculosis. The life expectancy at birth is 74 years of age. Health services are provided to Sri Lankan citizens free of charge and over 93% of the population has access to basic health care. The national prevalence of anemia among school children is about 12%. About one third of Sri Lankan children are undernourished (BMI-for age below the 5th percentile for age and sex). Children in the northern and eastern provinces have a much higher proportion of health problems when compared to children living in other provinces.

Sri Lanka has an extensive network of health care institutions. The health system consists of both the state and private sector. State health services include preventative, curative and rehabilitative health services. Health services are organized and delivered through the Department of Health Services and the Provincial Health Sector. The Sri Lankan health system incorporates Western, Ayurvedic and Homeopathic medicine. The Ministry of Health oversees national health services. Eight Provincial Directors of Health Services are responsible for the management and implementation of health services within each province. These services include provincial, base, district and rural hospitals, maternity homes and outpatient facilities. Each province is divided into geographical areas, with a defined population, who are served by a Medical Officers of Health (MOH). Within each MOH area, a team of field level health workers, including Public Health Nurses (PHN), Public Health Inspector (PHI) and Public Health Midwives (PHM), work with a Medical Officer to deliver health care services at a community level. The PHM are responsible for delivering antenatal, natal and postnatal services in hospitals, community health centers and in patient's homes. Several different types of health care facilities exist and patients may choose where they receive services.

Sri Lanka's achievements in maternal health and family planning are perceived as a success. In the 1930s, Sri Lanka's maternal mortality ratio (MMR) was 2,000 deaths per 100,000 live births. Recognizing this as a national problem, the government implemented programs to improve infrastructure, education, sanitation and health systems in poor and under-served areas. Simultaneously, there was an improvement in maternal health services and extensive training of, and improved community access to, Public Health Nurse-Midwives. Maternal care now encompasses antenatal care, intrapartum and postnatal care. These strategies enabled Sri Lanka to reduce the MMR by half every 6–12 years between 1930 and 1995. In 2002, the MMR was 43 per 100,000 live births. The estimated total fertility rate is 2.2 births per woman and population growth rate is 0.93%. The infant mortality rate was 11.2 per 1000 live births in 2003. The contraceptive prevalence rate was 70%; the infant mortality rate was 10.2 for female infants and 12.9 for male infants per 1,000 live births.

In 1927, the midwifery services in the Colombo municipality were re-organized to include training of all midwives working in the municipality. Since then, PHM training has continued expand and follow a standardized course. By 1958, about 58% of the births were attended by a skilled birth attendant, of which 25% were deliveries in the home by a PHM. Since the 1950s the number of institutional (maternity home or hospital) deliveries has continued to increase, and in 2001, 92% of all deliveries took place in institutions.

=== Effect of conflict on maternal health ===
Many years of ethnic conflict have led to separation between the various ethnic and religious groups who inhabit Sri Lanka. Women in living in the conflict zones of northern and eastern Sri Lanka experience worse maternal outcomes compared to national averages. Research conducted in the areas found significantly higher levels of poverty in conflict zones. On a national level, the proportion of the population living in poverty was 22.7%, but in the district of Amapara, nearly 65% of the population was living in poverty in 2002.

Young people living in conflict areas have higher rates of school drop-out, marry earlier and become pregnant earlier than young people in other parts of the country. Women in these areas face especially poor health outcomes These women are also subject to higher rates of domestic violence and many women report that their husbands force them to have sexual intercourse. Women in these areas have reduced access to contraception, and this may increase pregnancies in conflict zones. The total rate of fertility in conflict zones is 2.6 live births per woman while the national average is 2.2 live births per woman.

Lack of basic health infrastructure combined with shortages of health professionals has severely limited reproductive health services in the northern and eastern provinces. They have extremely limited access to emergency obstetric care, increased rates of maternal morbidity and mortality, and higher rates of low birth weight babies. While the national rates of home birth are very low, one out of five women in conflict areas birth at home. In some districts, such as Batticaloa, as many as 41% of women give birth at home. Primary reasons for home births are: destruction of health centers, danger of travel, lack of transportation and poverty. The national PHM program virtually eliminated traditional birth attendants in Sri Lanka, but when women are forced to birth at home they may have the assistance of a traditional medicine woman, known as Marauthuvivhvhi. These birth attendants use home remedies, such as powders, herbs, oils and an herbal drink called perunkayam to support the woman through birth. These factors increase the risk involved with childbirth and highlight the needs of women living in the northern and eastern provinces of Sri Lanka.

== Marriage ==
Unlike other Asian countries, Sri Lankan women have had equal access to education for many years and men and women enjoy similar rates of literacy. In other countries women's increased access to education and increased presence in the workforce has delayed the age of marriage, but these factors are less influential in Sri Lanka. Typically, Sri Lankans marry later than people in other Asian countries. In 1961, the average age of marriage was 22 years old, and today the average age of marriage is 25 years old in Sri Lanka. Muslim women marry earlier than Sinhalese and Tamil women. School attendance is believed to delay the age of marriage because women in school are not considered adults and are not ready for marriage. Birth order also influences age of marriage. Women with unmarried older sisters tend to marry later because of the tradition that women should marry in their birth order. Women who have arranged marriages typically marry later than those who choose their own husbands.

== Infertility ==
Infertility is a deeply distressing issue among Sri Lankan couples. In the Sinhalese culture, birth is the sign of a successful marriage and rituals are performed if a woman does not conceive during the early years of marriage. Often the couple and family members will make vows at a religious shrine and seek blessings from monks to help with conception. When a woman has a difficult time becoming pregnant, some people believe it is caused by misdeeds that took place in a previous lifetime. Performing virtuous deeds in the present life can help neutralize these deeds. Examples of beneficial acts include giving money to monks, beggars or children in need, lighting lamps or bathing the foot of a sacred Bo-tree with water or milk.

A cultural issue arises when considering sperm donation among Buddhists. While donation of blood or body products are considered virtuous giving of one's self, semen is a very different matter. In Aruvedic medicine, semen is "considered the highest of substances" and "loss of such a powerful substance is widely held to have a number of consequences such as anxiety, mental impairment, and impotence. Some physicians expressed concerns about the risk of potential mix-ups of sperm in in-vitro fertilization, fearing "children with such origins might experience a deep and troubling sense of strangeness towards a father who is not biologically related whilst expressing a desire to establish the genitor's real identity.". Because sperm donation involves ejaculation, which has origins in "physical pleasure for which there can be no justification in Buddhism," acquiring donor sperm is often a difficult task. Monetary incentives cannot be used because the purchase of human tissue, including gametes, is illegal).

== Pregnancy ==
=== Ideas regarding pregnancy ===
Even though the government has actively encouraged family planning, Sri Lankans still regard pregnancy as a blessing and birth is a symbol of a successful marriage. Pregnancy outside of marriage is very rare in Sri Lanka. Culturally it is important that a woman remains a virgin until marriage. Single mothers do not receive government-based aid. Children born to unwed mothers are often labeled as illegitimate and considered outcasts in society.

=== Preparation for birth ===
When husbands learn their wife is pregnant, they make a vow to perform the Ratrayakuma ritual. This ritual, which involves hanging a pot containing coins, a betel leaf and flowers from the rafters, is done to appease the evil spirit Rata Yaka, who is believed to prevent successful child bearing and delivery. During a first pregnancy, couples often visit temples of special significance in the Buddhist faith. Examples of such temples are Temple of the Tooth in Kandy or the Sacred Bodhi tree at Anuradhapura. At the temple they pray for the pregnancy and ask for an uncomplicated birth and healthy life. They make vows to ensure their wishes are granted. If their wishes are granted, they return to the temple or shrine to make offerings of praise to the Gods who protected their newborn child and mother during pregnancy and birth.

During pregnancy, family members take care to please the pregnant mother and protect her, and her unborn child, by relieving her of household duties. The pregnant woman's mother, grandmother or mother-in-law supervises meals. While pregnant, women may experience Doladuka, or suffering of two hearts. This experience includes unusual desires to eat particularly sour fruits or indulge in specific acts. These wishes must be fulfilled to protect the fetus from physical or mental defects. Pregnant women avoid eating twinned foods as they are thought to lead to the birth of twins. Relatives and friends visit often to give gifts of fruits and boiled rice with curry wrapped in a banana leaf. Traditionally, baby showers are considered bad luck and gifts are not given until after the birth of the child. When preparing clothing for the new baby, care is taken to never complete the garment before the birth of the baby, as this assumes the birth is a certainty.

In the last three months of pregnancy, it is typical for women move their parents’ home and stay a few weeks after the delivery to recover and receive care. This practice is especially common among first time mothers. During this time, Buddhist monks are invited to the home to chant blessings and expel evil spirits who might harm the woman and fetus.

=== Prenatal care ===
The PHM provides prenatal care to women at home visits and in health clinics. These visits include blood pressure screening, measurement of weight and education related to nutritional needs during pregnancy. A PHM registers all pregnant women, and most are registered in the first trimester of pregnancy. Nearly every pregnant woman (98.5%) receives antenatal care. According to Demographic and Health Survey 2000, 95% of women visited a clinic at least once during pregnancy and 84% had a midwife visit her home. Most women receive six or more home visits by the PHM during pregnancy. Only a very small percent of pregnant women receive fewer than three visits by a PHM. Women typically receive one visit during the first trimester, then two to three visits additional during each of the second and third trimesters.

=== Extrinsic factors ===
Currently little information exists regarding extrinsic factors that may affect pregnancy, such as air, water, food and drink. This is an area for additional research.

== Birth ==
=== Location and type of delivery ===
Skilled birth attendants attend more than 97% of births In Sri Lanka. Nearly all births (99%) take place in a hospital or maternity home and are assisted by a physician or PHM. All first pregnancies and high-risk pregnancies are referred to a health facility staffed by an obstetrician. Most women give birth vaginally, but the incidence of cesarean section, or C-section, is rising. In 1986, the rate of C-section was 9% and by 1999, the rate rose to 14.4% of births in government hospitals. Currently, 66% of births are spontaneous vaginal deliveries, 4% are operative vaginal deliveries and 30% are by C-section. It is hypothesized that the increase in C-sections is due to a variety of factors, including increased use of epidural anesthesia and fetal monitoring.

=== Use of technology ===
Little information is known about actual practices in Sri Lanka, but the Sri Lankan College of Obstetric Gynecology (SLCOG) publishes national guidelines for management of certain conditions of pregnancy.

=== Uncomplicated labor ===
SLCOG defines normal labor as "spontaneous onset, low-risk at the start and remaining low risk throughout the process". Normal labor results in a birth between 37 and 42 weeks gestation and the fetus is delivered from a vertex presentation. Once a woman is determined to be in uncomplicated labor, confirmed by vaginal examination and painful contractions, she is transferred to the labor suite of the hospital or maternity home. While routine enemas are not recommended, SLCOG does emphasize that "efforts must be make to minimize fecal soiling…to overcome the practical difficulties associated with cleaning and maintaining sterility". Low risk women are allowed to consume clear fluids during early labor, but must consult an anesthesiologist first. SLCOG recommends that maternal preference be honored when considering mobility and posture during labor. The organization recommends standing and lateral recumbent positioning to minimize reductions in uterine blood supply and reductions in cardiac output. Intermittent fetal heart auscultation and observation of vaginal discharge is used to assess the fetal condition. A partogram is recommended to facilitate monitoring during labor. During the second stage of labor, women are encouraged to assume the most comfortable position. In the second stage of labor fetal heart rate should be assessed every 15 minutes and the fetal heart rate should be assessed after each contraction while bearing down. Active management of labor with oxytocin is recommended in the third stage of labor. Medio-lateral episiotomies are recommended to expedite delivery or prevent perineal injury. Once the neonate is delivered, the umbilical cord is clamped and cut, controlled cord traction should be applied. It is recommended that the placenta, membranes and umbilical cord are examined for abnormalities after delivery. After delivery, women should be monitored for complication for two hours in the labor suite.

=== Premature rupture of membranes ===
Management of preterm rupture of membranes involves either expectant or active management. The classification depends on maturity of the fetus, neonatal facilities available at the place of birth, presence of infection and fetal distress. Expectant management involves general observation of vital signs and fetal observations, including kick count, presentation, daily electronic fetal monitoring and weekly ultrasound. Active management beyond 32 weeks gestational age involves administration of corticosteroids, antibiotics and awaiting active labor. If active labor does not begin within 24 hours, delivery is advised.

=== Pain management in labor ===
Generally, Sri Lankan women prefer to give birth without pharmacologic pain management. SLCOG recommends that birthing women be provided with adequate analgesia and the selection of pain relief is determined by institutional protocols, drug availability and patient preference. Pethidine is the most common drug used for pain management during labor, especially in maternity units where clinicians with advanced medical training and monitoring facilities may not be present. During C-sections, 80% of women receive spinal anesthesia, 15% epidural and 5% general anesthesia. Non-pharmacologic pain management includes breathing techniques, hot and cold therapy, massage, relaxation techniques, acupuncture, herbalism and hypnosis. Women often recite pirith to control breathing during labor. This is a chant performed by monks during pregnancy to ensure safe delivery.

=== Extrinsic factors ===
Currently little information exists regarding extrinsic factors that affect birth, such as air, water, food and drink. This is an area for additional research.

== Registration of Birth ==
Every birth should be registered with the government to obtain a birth certificate which act as the main legal document for a citizen in Sri Lanka. The name of the child (which is given by the parent), details of the mother and the father will be entered in the birth certificate. The birth certificate will be required to obtain the National Identity Card, Passport and many more legal activities. An application form should be obtained from Divisional Secretariat and proceed with the registration.

== Birth traditions ==
The specific date and time of birth are carefully recorded to determine a child's horoscope. The time of birth determines the zodiac sign, and also specific character traits of the child. The horoscope is significant throughout the lifecycle. It is read by an astrologer at birth, puberty, prior to an examination or new job, when determining if a potential spouse is a good match, or for any other important decision.

== Postpartum ==
The postpartum time is not clearly defined; however the puerperium period is defined as the first six weeks in the postpartum period. Most women who deliver vaginally spend one night in a health institution, while about 5% return home the day of delivery. Women who deliver by C-section typically spend seven nights in the health institution before returning home.

Sri Lanka does not have a system to record maternal morbidity, but research suggests maternal morbidity is an area of concern among Sri Lankan mothers. Sri Lankan mothers generally feel that it is natural to experience ill health after childbirth. About 90% of women who deliver vaginally and 75% women who deliver by C-section report illness in the puerperium period. Examples of these illnesses include excessive bleeding, fever, constipation, breast engorgement, painful urination, backache and abdominal pain. Buddhist mothers have the highest incidence of illness while Muslim mothers had the fewest poor health outcomes after birth.

== Newborn Rites of Passage ==
Newborn rites of passage vary among ethnic group. Sinhalese, Tamil and Muslim families publicly announce the birth of a child as a gesture of accepting the newborn as a member of the family. This may be a casual or grand celebration and often involves food, dancing and singing.

=== Sinhalese ===
The exact time of birth is reported to an astrologer who uses the child's horoscope to determine the best letters for the child's name. Nam tebima is the Sinhalese naming ceremony. The baby's first outing is typically to a Buddhist temple on a full moon day to receive blessings for a prosperous life. Idul kata gema is the ceremony to celebrate a baby's first solid food. The ceremony, which takes place either in the family home or in a temple, involves placing dishes of rice boiled with milk, traditional sweets, a banana, a book and a piece of jewelry. The family observes as the baby is allowed to crawl onto the mat and select an item. If the child chooses the food, he or she will have a healthy appetite for life, if the child chooses the book he or she will have a future in academia, and if the child chooses the jewelry he or she has a promise of fortune and success.

=== Tamil ===
The name-giving ceremony, Namakarana samskar, typically takes place 11–41 days after birth. During this ceremony the baby's father whispers the new name in the infant's right ear. It is typical to celebrate a baby's first consumption of solid food when a child receives his or her first taste of rice. The ceremony typically occurs in a kovil, or Hindu temple. The meal of boiled rice usually occurs between six and eight months of age. Other childhood rituals include the Chudakarana samskara, or head-shaving ceremony, which represents purity and removes all remnants of birth pollution. This event marks the end of infancy and the beginning of childhood. Karnavedhna Samskara is the name of the ear piercing ceremony that typically takes place either in a temple or at home on the first birthday.

=== Muslim ===
Muslim boys are circumcised between the ages of seven days and ten years. Some communities circumcise males as neonates, while others believe the child should be old enough to understand the significance of the event. Traditionally, a community member performed circumcisions in the boy's home, though some families now have the procedure done in a medical center. The celebration includes new clothes for the boy and a special meal prepared for family and friends.

== Breastfeeding ==
Breastfeeding is a culturally accepted and encouraged practice in Sri Lanka. The rate of breastfeeding initiation is nearly 100%. In Sri Lanka, public health officials recommend exclusive breastfeeding for the first six months of a child's life. PHM and medical officers of health provide pre-and post-natal counseling and education to support women in breastfeeding practices. In 2000, 54% of women breastfed exclusively for the first four months of life. Little data exists to determine rate of exclusive breastfeeding at six months of age, but it is believed that very few mothers breastfeed exclusively until their newborn reaches six months of age. A study that integrated low cost staff training with job supervision of PHM showed a significant increase in exclusive breastfeeding among mothers in Beruwala, Sri Lanka. The authors believe that six months exclusive breastfeeding is a realistic goal in Sri Lanka and suggest a need to increase training and support for PHM in maternal health care settings.

== Circumcision ==
No information exists on the current rates of male or female circumcision in Sri Lanka. Generally, these are not common procedures among Buddhist and Hindu populations. Male circumcision is practiced among Muslims and is traditionally an occasion for celebration.

== Contraception ==
Contraception is widely used in Sri Lanka, though generally considered a women's issue. The country has a vasectomy rate of 3.7% and many people believe vasectomy inhibits men from performing hard labor. In 1979, to increase the use of vasectomy in family planning, the Sri Lankan government began offering monetary incentives to men who agreed to undergo the procedure. Financial payment was the often primary reason for obtaining a vasectomy. Many Sri Lankan couples discuss the need for contraception to limit family size and space pregnancies. More than two thirds of the married population use some form of contraception. Generally, husbands support the use of female contraception. In 1993, nearly one fourth of married women were sterilized, however the prevalence of female sterilization fell to 17% of ever-married women by 2007. Women feel it is important to use a method of contraception approved by their husbands. This information guides the need to educate both men and women about contraceptive options, use and side effects.

== Additional information ==
- From 1977 to 1978, an outbreak of acute polyneuropathy affected more than 20 young women. This illness that was restricted to girls attaining menarche and to women after childbirth. The cause of neuropathy could be traced to tri-cresyl phosphate found as a contaminant in gingili oil.
