= Childbirth in Haiti =

Childbirth in Haiti follows a system of behavior determined by local beliefs, traditions and attitudes, and is also affected by economic conditions and limitations of available health care facilities.

== Pregnancy ==
In Haiti, infertility carries a negative social stigma; women are expected to bear children. The period of pregnancy and birth is viewed as a happy, celebratory time for a family, not a medical health problem.

Pregnant women are expected to fulfill their work obligations up until their delivery. It is normal for pregnant women to experience an increase in salivation and to spit frequently, since they do not believe in swallowing their excess saliva. Women may sometimes carry a spit cup with them and feel no embarrassment in using it in public. Pregnant women are restricted from eating spices, which they believe may irritate the fetus. However, they are encouraged to eat vegetables and red fruits, which are believed to build up the blood of the fetus. Pregnant women are also encouraged to eat large portions as they are eating for two.

== Prenatal care ==
Many pregnant women in Haiti receive little health care because of poverty, lack of access, scarcity of healthcare professionals, and views on prenatal care. These issues are more pronounced for women in rural areas, since most of the health care professionals are concentrated in the capitol. The doctor-patient ratio in Haiti is 1 to 67,000, and a percentage of health care workers leave the country each year to work in the United States and Canada, where the pay is better. The available health infrastructure is significantly decreased in the aftermath of the 2010 earthquake, which destroyed vital health facilities.

Many pregnant women see no need for prenatal care, and some fear and actively avoid modern medicine and hospitals, viewing pregnancy, labor and delivery as normal parts of a woman's life cycle.

== Labor ==
In Haiti, many women work until the delivery of the baby. Thus, many of them do not labor in a hospital. Either they labor in the home or their work location. Many women are very active during the laboring process. They will squat, stand, pace, or sit to create more comfortable positions for themselves. They will express their emotions by yelling, screaming, cursing, grunting, or moaning.

Pain medications are not commonly available in Haitian birth culture. Most women labor and birth their babies away from the hospital, and do not ask for pain medications.

During the labor process, the father of the baby is absent, and the mother may be alone, with a midwife, or female family member and friends may surround her. Much of the decision-making relies on the woman in labor, and coaching from the support people is kept at a minimum.

== Birth ==
Traditionally, most women in Haiti have births attended by midwives who are not always formally educated. Midwives are generally taught by older midwives with experience. Birth typically takes place in the home. Geographically, many roads are still destroyed from the earthquake in 2010, and in any case women do not have cars to get themselves to a hospital or a birth center.

== Complications and abnormalities ==
Pre-eclampsia and eclampsia complications are some of the leading causes in Haiti's high maternal mortality rate. These complications account for seventeen percent of all maternal deaths. (Small, 2005). Because of the lack of prenatal care, many women do not realize the signs of pre-eclampsia and eclampsia until the delivery of the baby. By then, it is often too late to intervene. Medical facilities are often not available nearby in any case. Those in need of emergency C-sections often never receive them because many women do not have the money for them.

== Postpartum ==
In Haiti, the postpartum period begins immediately after birth and lasts about 40 days. The mother remains in the home, focusing on rest and recuperation. She takes an active role in her own care, dressing warmly, taking daily sitz baths and drinking tea to rejuvenate.

== Cultural beliefs and behaviors ==
In the first three days, strict bed rest is encouraged as well as the avoidance of anything "cold," such as drafts, going outside, and certain foods. Along with "cold" foods mothers are also taught to avoid "white" foods, such as white Lima beans, lobster, and milk. "White" and "cold" foods are believed to increase vaginal discharge and/or risk for hemorrhage. Foods acceptable for the mother to eat during this period include porridge, rice, beans, and plantain. Haitians believe that women are more susceptible to gas entering the body, during this period. To prevent this, mothers are encouraged to wear a tight belt or piece of linen around the waist to tighten bones loosened during childbirth.

A common practice during the postpartum period is the "three baths." In the first three days, the mother bathes in fortified water prepared from boiling special herbs in the water, including papaya, sour orange, soursop (corossol), mint (ti baume), anise, bugleweed and eucalyptus. These herbs relax the mother and cause her muscles to tighten. This is known as the first bath. Mothers are also encouraged to drink a special tea made from the same mixture. The second bath occurs after the three-day mark for another three days where the mother bathes in herb-fortified water that is warmed by the sun, not boiled. The third bath occurs at the one-month mark and is a cold bath, the first one the mother takes since delivery. A cold bath is done to promote healing and tightening of the muscles and bones loosened during delivery.

== Breastfeeding practices ==
Breastfeeding is widely practiced in Haiti for cultural and socioeconomic reasons; 97% of infants are breastfed. Breastfeeding is encouraged for up to nine months with mothers in rural areas continuing for longer because it is economical and practical. A misconception held in Haiti is that breastmilk is the cause of infant illnesses such as diarrhea, tetanus, or intestinal parasites. Haitian mothers are also particular about the form of milk given to infants, as it is believed that milk that is too thick or thin can be detrimental to both mother and child. If the milk is too thick, it is believed to cause impetigo in the infant. If the milk is too thin, believed to be caused by maternal fright or worry, the milk has "turned" and may cause diarrhea and failure to thrive in the infant, and headache and possibly postpartum depression in the mother. In alternatives to breast milk the "hot" and "cold" diet that many Haitians believe in is followed here as well. The postpartum period is considered a "hot" period and requires "cold" foods. Whole milk is acceptable. However, formula is considered a "hot" food and is avoided. Herbal tea is also introduced early in the infant and is an integral part of feeding.

== Rites and rituals ==
There are many rites of passage and birth rituals practiced in Haiti. Naming of the newborn baby occurs one month after birth. The nose of newborn is gently pinched several times a day in an effort to narrow the nostrils, which is considered more attractive in Haiti. The hair of the infant is not cut prior to one year of age. Male circumcision is not encouraged, as it is believed to reduce sexual satisfaction. Purgatives (lok) are often given to newborns to cleanse their insides of first stools. A common purgative is made with a base of red oil from a plant known as maskreti in Creole. Other main ingredients include castor oil, sugar, garlic, boiled water, salt, and nutmeg. Mothers are cautioned that rapid dehydration may result from this practice. *Nutmeg, castor oil, and a spider web are among some of the substances placed on umbilical stump to speed healing and prevent newborn from "catching umbilical cold". In rural areas, the placenta is buried to prevent harm to the child.

== Role of caregivers ==
In traditional families, mothers occupy the caregiver role. In single-parent families where the mother is the provider, the role of caregiver is extended to the maternal grandmother. For the first three months, caregivers avoid taking the newborn outside after late afternoon because it is a "cold " environment. The air is dangerous at this time and can cause the infant to become sick and agitated, with darker bowel movements as another symptom. If baby must be outside, the caregiver covers their body and head well. At one month, the caregiver can begin bathing the infant in cold water to build up their resistance. Caregivers massage the limbs and buttocks of the newborn after bathing. They pull and push on the most exterior parts of limbs, as if locking them into place, to shape the child's body and give it tone.

Caregivers are also discouraged from holding the infant for long periods of times. It is believed that if the caregiver holds the baby too much, the baby will be slower in hitting milestones, such as learning to sit up, crawl, and walk. Caregivers are encouraged to leave baby on the ground and any bumps or falls that occur are seen as necessary milestones in their learning process. Mothers reluctant to follow this practice are often criticized. The caregiver is also responsible for extracting milk from the infant's body to allegedly prevent the infant from having body odor when they reach adolescence. Squeezing the infant's nipples does this. This milk is present in newborns due to the high level of the mother's hormones from the womb and breastfeeding, causing them to lactate for a period of time.
