= Childbirth in Mexico =

In its early history, Mexico was occupied by a large number of indigenous civilizations such as the Mayans and Aztecs. In the 16th century, Spain colonized New Spain and took over the land from the indigenous peoples. Though it is now an independent nation, Mexico retains much of the cultural influence of Spain, including its official religion of Catholicism, the Spanish language, and the importance of machismo - the belief that men are superior to women. Mexico also retains much of the traditional beliefs of the indigenous peoples who first occupied the country. Besides Spanish, there are over one hundred different languages spoken in the country today. As a result, the current medical system involves a mix of traditional and Western medicinal techniques.

Traditional beliefs such as Susto, also known as fear of illness, is thought to occur when the soul leaves the body and wanders. It is believed that women experience this more often than men. Empacho, or the dislocation of body functions is often associated with morning sickness in pregnancy because it is believed that the baby is bringing increased energy to the digestive process. Mal de Ojo is another important perceived cause of illness which relates to birth. It is believed that if someone is looked upon with admiration or jealousy that they will become ill themselves.

In Mexico, approximately 46.2% are below the poverty line, the average life expectancy is 76.7 years, 73.9 years in males, and 79.6 years in females. 95.8% of the population is literate. In the country, the Infant mortality rate is low, compared to other countries, Mexico is 127 with 10.7 deaths to 1,000 births, the maternal mortality rate is also low, occupying number 108 compared to other countries with a ratio of 33 deaths to 100,000 live births. The contraceptive use rate in the country is about 66.9% a little high compared to other countries.

== Pregnancy ==
Mexico contains a variety of indigenous groups, cultural influences, and socioeconomic situations which all affect health outcomes. However, amongst all groups, pregnancy is welcome. The majority of the unintended pregnancies end up in an abortion. Furthermore, there is little information on the sex education received by women from different socioeconomic classes and geographic regions, which may influence pregnancy behaviors and beliefs. Traditional culture believes that pregnancy is a sacred event. This belief carries over into the post-Colombian Catholic culture that is very prevalent in Mexico today. The traditional birth culture is shaped by the beliefs of a hot-cold balance within the body. This balance must be maintained throughout the pregnancy and delivery process. To ensure the balance, women will avoid "hot" foods during their pregnancy as the gestation is considered a "hot" event. Furthermore, women attempting to become pregnant are advised to avoid cold surfaces, like medical examination tables, as they are thought to promote sterility or infertility.

The main differentiator of pregnancy behaviors is socioeconomic status. This will influence a woman's outlook on pregnancy, her level of care received during pregnancy and the lifestyle changes that she makes during this time. Women are encouraged to avoid strenuous work during pregnancy, and some are encouraged to leave work altogether in order to ensure a healthy pregnancy and birth. During pregnancy a majority of women will receive some form of prenatal care. The World Bank Data's most recent statistic for the Mexican prenatal care stated that 98.5% of women were seeking some prenatal care, while 94.3% of the women receiving prenatal care had at least four visits to the doctor's office (2020). While a vast majority of women are receiving care, this is often not consistent and varies across socioeconomic class. Women of a higher socioeconomic class are more likely to seek care from a GP than their counterparts. Historically, women have been more likely to seek prenatal care later in their pregnancy, with many women not obtaining such care until the second trimester. Data that breaks down incidence of modern prenatal care needs to be collected.

Besides maintaining the hot-cold balance and avoiding work, there are other lifestyle changes that a woman may take on during her pregnancy. Women are encouraged to walk frequently throughout their pregnancies and often talk to their mothers or grandmothers for comfort or advice. Strong familial support is tied to improved pregnancy outcomes as the family is traditionally very supportive of the pregnant woman.

== Labor ==
Recently, the president of Mexico, Andrés Manuel López Obrador (AMLO), removed the use of the Seguro Popular (Popular Insurance). The health insurance was provided to all the Mexican citizens but was commonly used by low income citizens; Now the president provided the citizens with the use of the Institute of Health for Welfare (Spanish: Instituto de Salud para el Bienestar, INSABI). Access to care is restricted in many ways, and to such an extent that certain members of the population have access to forms of care and choices that others do not. Citizens that live in small towns or rural areas are least likely to receive proper health care because there are not a lot of hospitals available in the areas or they are not properly equipped. There are private healthcare institutions available for those who can afford them, and large public health institutions which can provide care without costs to those eligible to be enrolled in their programs. Maternal hospitals, public and private, are generally available in large cities, while general hospitals are also available in rural areas. Typically, the number of days that women stay at the hospital after giving birth varies in every case. In 1987 more than 80% of births in Mexico took place under the care of traditional midwives and empirical midwives.

There are two fundamental concepts in the traditional medicine practiced in Mexico; hot-cold duality and naturaleza (inherent nature):

- Hot-cold duality— all illnesses, physical conditions, drinks, foods are either hot or cold. Pregnancy is considered a hot condition, where upon birth women lose heat and are at risk of becoming dangerously cold.
- Naturaleza— encompasses all the characteristics and qualities that physically and spiritually comprise an individual. One can have a strong or weak nature, this is determined by the phases of the mother, and the nature of the parents. This nature can in turn, influence sexuality, family size, and a person's physical spiritual and temperamental characteristics. By extension, these things can affect one's pregnancy and birthing process (onset and length)

Traditional midwives sometimes use hydrotherapy, there are two basic types described in the literature:

- Temazcal (sweat bath)— used prenatally, postpartum, and sometimes during the intrapartum period. The bath uses herbs that have bacteriostatic, anti inflammatory and other therapeutic qualities
- Vapor (steam bath)— also uses herbal infusions with the addition of essential oils. Laboring woman will sit on a chair that is on top of a larger streaming container.

Traditionalist midwives may sometimes also incorporate some of the following to help ease the process of labor:

- Medicinal plants and animal substances, not just orally, but through external application like massage and poultices, as well as douching.
- Sobada (therapeutic touch/massage); can be done prenatally to change position of fetus (can prevent problems with abnormal presentation), aid prolonged labor, and difficulty delivering placenta.
- May invoke protector spirits (Virgin Mary or saints). They pray and call to these spirits to find reassurance and deal with the uncertainties surrounding pregnancy, birth, and puerperium (6-week period after childbirth where reproductive organs return to their original nonpregnant condition).
- Use of oxytocic injections and administration of intravenous fluids to speed labor has become more widespread, even with traditional midwives.
- It is believed that things like brujeria, mal aire, and susto can affect birth outcomes and the labor process. Sometimes red ribbon and clothes can be worn or used to prevent el mal de ojo.

Policies surrounding labor vary from location and type of facility, so labor processes can vary amongst women geographically and by socioeconomic status. In large public hospitals women who birth there tend to have some sort of Psychoprophylaxis class (Lamaze technique) before going into labor. The Lamaze classes help women to prepare them for labor, they are taught techniques in preparation for childbearing without the use of anesthesia. Techniques include education, psychological and physical conditioning, and breathing exercises. These classes are not necessarily hospital affiliated (i.e. they are taught outside of the hospital and obstetricians do not directly refer women to them, so there is not a wide attendance). Women often laboring in these hospitals will have epidurals or other forms of analgesia, if deemed necessary. Family members are not allowed in labor unless the family member has also taken Psychoprophylaxis courses.

In privately ran hospitals, women will often get discharged 24hrs after vaginal delivery and 48hrs following a Cesarean. Standard practice is that all laboring women have intravenous lines, pubic hair is not routinely shaved, and all primiparas are given episiotomies. In these hospitals the father or other family members are required to be present during labor and birth (even for Cesareans), although only one member is allowed to be present because of space. Presence of support system (family members or father) is also encouraged at prenatal visits. During labor women are allowed to walk, drink juice (among other liquids). Babies must remain with their mother's postpartum because the only nursery available is meant for babies with low apgar scores and/or low temperatures, and even these babies are only kept under observation at the nursery for 3–4 hours. Sick babies, who have a birth condition, got sick at birth, or those who might need serious medical treatment are transferred to a children's hospital to receive better treatment. Most, if not all, neonates are breastfed.

In local midwife practice, the homes the midwife would attend would often have no telephones, electricity, nor running water. She (the midwife) will bring an oxygen tank, Doppler unit, Pitocin and methergine in case of hemorrhage, herbal tinctures, suture material, bulb syringe among other things. She might also bring a car in case emergency transportation is necessary. During labor the midwife will massage the laboring person with oils and use hot compresses, and encourage walking and position changes to facilitate labor. Delivery will often happen in a semi sitting or squatting position. After the baby is born the midwife will stay with the mother and baby from 2 – 4 hrs. She might use aceite de palo (plant oil extract) for the cord stump, which is to be applied with every diaper change to help disinfect and dry the cord rapidly.

== Birth ==
Birth attendants can include a variety of providers, including general physicians (GP), obstetric nurses (ON), professional midwives (PM) and traditional birth attendants (TBA). ONs and PMs are not widely used in the hospital setting and physicians account for 87% of obstetric care in Mexico. The education and outcomes for each profession are outlined here. The WHO-supported competencies for skilled birth attendants are met 43% by GP education, 54% by ON education, and 89% by PM education. The ON is educated at the University level while the PM must have completed secondary education and then a 3-year midwifery education program. A 2011 study found that PMs often have improved outcomes compared to GPs and ONs, possibly due to their apprentice-like education. GPs and ONs are associated with higher use of episiotomy and oxytocin.

TBAs have varying levels of education. 'Traditional' TBAs tend to live in remote indigenous regions and their knowledge is passed down through oral tradition. Trained TBAs have typically attended some form of institutional training program. Unskilled TBAs lack the generational knowledge of indigenous TBAs and do not have the education of the trained TBAs. While the overall number of hospital births and physician-based obstetric care has increased in recent years, maternal mortality has not significantly changed. This is because in rural states, a little more than 40% of births still occur at home either with or without a skilled birth attendant; Mexico is one of the countries with the highest number of C-sections performed, with 30% more than recommended by the WHO. Additionally, rural clinics tend to be staffed by GPs or medical students, who often lack obstetric experience or expertise. Around of 53.1% of the institutional deliveries are vaginal, while 46.9% are by a C-section or were planned. Many doctors plan the delivery of the baby so they mother can be prepared and be on time at the hospital. In more traditional births, women are allowed to birth in whichever position is most comfortable for them, with many opting for a squatting position. In some cases, the spouse will hold the birthing woman as she pushes .

Pain relief is variable amongst women, with rates of pharmaceutical analgesia being higher in institutional births. This is further outlined in the section regarding labor. After the infant is expelled from the body, a TBA may stand in between the mother's legs to prevent the heat of pregnancy escaping, which throws off the hot-cold balance. Once the placenta is delivered, it is typically set aside to be analyzed for completeness. Indication of a retained placenta can be cause for increased medical intervention. If the birth is taking place in a home, the birth attendant may bring the mother into a clinic or hospital in case of complication related to retained placenta. Traditionally, the placenta is buried at the home, with a male's placenta being buried under the porch and a female's being buried near the stove.

== Postpartum ==
Postpartum visits will often include family planning and teaching; still there are some similar beliefs across the board about the harmful effects of contraceptives. Especially since fertility is highly valued among the culture, pregnancy is viewed as a gift from God. In traditional practice it is believed that the maternal postpartum diet should only include chicken, burned tortillas, coffee and atole (corn and flour based beverage), nothing of a cold nature is allowed. Shifts in modern medicine have a lot less restrictions, including a varied diet and milk. The biggest postpartum ritual in Mexico is the idea of the cuarentena (Postpartum confinement). This is a forty-day postpartum period of rest, where women are supposed to avoid bathing, intimacy, and remain in some ways secluded. Family relatives (especially female family relatives) are supposed to help with cooking, cleaning, and taking care of the mother's older children while she rests. Diet restrictions during cuarentena include no chili, spices, cold foods, fish, pork and citrus. This is a practice that can be traced to biblical times (Leviticus 12 from the bible, this practice continues to play on the Catholic influence on the population's overall culture). More midwives are teaching women to practice a prompt return to normal activity, instead of observing the cuarentena. Not observing the cuarentena was thought to lead to illness, infertility, infection and even death.

In private hospitals, patients will be seen as soon as a week after discharge for a complete check up. They will have follow up family planning visits one month into the postpartum period, women are then encouraged to have annual vaginal exams after the cuarentena. IUDs (Intrauterine Devices) are the most popular forms of contraception, these will be inserted during these visits. Paternalism is a major cultural principle and practice that also plays out during postpartum visits because men tend to be very involved in the decision making of what kind of contraception may be used, if any.

== Newborns ==
In Mexican culture, newborns are highly revered. The cuarentena period mentioned above is also largely for the newborn. The traditional cultural belief of "mal de ojo" is the main rationale behind this. It is believed that if the baby receives too much admiration from others, especially those outside of the family structure, that the baby will fall ill. For this reason, there are not any public ceremonies honoring the baby, though many families participate in a christening to thank God for the gift that they have been given. While the responsibility of caring for the newborn falls mainly on the mother, it is very common for the extended family to have a large part in child rearing. Often many families live in very close proximity, sometimes even in the same house as each other due to a strong emphasis placed on family values in Mexican culture. This transcends the nuclear family and extends into extended family. For example, the elders in the family are in charge of the care of the baby's umbilical stump. The stump is covered by a coin and then the abdomen is wrapped tightly in a cloth, which is often red, as the color red is thought to ward off bad spirits. This dressing is changed daily, as it is thought necessary to place an herbal blend on the stump to aide in healing and prevent infection.

The concept of purity is important when taking care of newborns in Mexican culture, and therefore most babies are not breastfed; around of 14% of the Mothers breastfeed their newborns. Breastmilk is viewed as impure and unsafe. Babies are generally exclusively formula fed until two to three months at which time non-milk items are added to their diet. In Mexican culture, it is believed that in order to keep an infant pure of heart, and in turn healthy, they must never experience distress. For this reason, infants spend most of their time being held by a family member to prevent them from crying. As young newborns, they are also swaddled in blankets made by family members to make them feel safe. Co-sleeping and babywearing are also encouraged as they are thought to allow the infant to gain spiritual strength through their mother which will protect them from evil spirits and promote good health. In an effort to avoid upsetting the infant and putting them at risk of being impure, circumcision is discouraged in Mexico, 10% to 30% is estimated to be the prevalence of circumcision in the country, but many hospitals do not keep a record of their data.

After the baby is born, their parents need to register the baby at the Civil Registry Office (Registro Civil); once the baby is registered, the parents will receive their birth certificate. Usually, the baby will be registered with their father's last name followed by their mother's last name. The birth certificate serves to have a record of the population and also it serves as an identification for the baby, that later will be needed to be able to register to their schools among other things. Unfortunately, many people are not registered, even that the service is free, because they do not have access to an office or they do not have the required documents to be able to complete the registration.
