= Superstition in Ethiopia =

Institutional attitudes and beliefs in Ethiopia

Superstition is highly prevalent in Ethiopia. Like Turkey and Greece, Ethiopian culture believes in the evil eye. In Ethiopia this belief helps uphold a caste system.

== Buda ==
One folk religion inspired by superstition is Buda. Buda is associated with Beta Israel (Ethiopian Jews) and lower castes, primarily with artisans and manual laborers. Manual laborers are considered lower caste by the aristocratic families, who, like tribal lords, spiritualists, and scholars are considered part of the highest caste. Within this social structure, manual laborers socializing with higher castes is seen as sinful and impure, with the lower caste being referred to as "envious, malevolent, and selfish", and "carriers of evil". Beads and amulets such as Kitab jewelry are worn to protect against some effects of the evil eye.

Samuel Gobat recorded an encounter in the 1830s when a Christian priest accused some members of Beta Israel of being Budas; they rejected the charge: "We are not boudas. [...] if boudas exist, you are obliged to believe that they can do nothing contrary to the will of God; consequently they cannot harm those who have true faith in God. Thus your groundless fear of boudas only proves your total want of faith in the God of Israel."

According to Niall Finneran, "the idea of magical creation underpins the perception of artisans in Ethiopia and in the wider African context. In many cases, these skills have been originally acquired from an elemental source of evil via the paternal lineage, rather like a Faustian pact." It is also believed that these powers allow one to shapeshift into animals such as hyenas. These beliefs are also present in Sudan, Tanzania, and among the Berber people in Morocco.

== Other beliefs ==
In Ethiopia, it is generally agreed that there are twelve harmful superstition-related practices, including female genital mutilation, polygamy, uvulotomy, milk teeth extraction, forced marriage, food prohibition, work restriction, abdominal massaging of pregnant women, excessive feasting, unnecessary incision, and widow inheritance.

Among the Bale Oromos, fungo is a belief that a dowsing rope will act as an object of divination. This superstition was observed during the Ethiopian Civil War, when parents went to a diviner to find their children who had been displaced during the war.

Other superstitious Ethiopian practices and beliefs include:

- The common practice of slaughtering a goat before the birth of a baby (this may be due to Ethiopia's relatively high infant mortality rate).
- The belief is that if a spotted hyena scratches a house, the resident will be victim to a future war.
- That a hyena screaming is an omen of death. Two hyenas screaming signifies children would die, five to six a woman, and seven a man. Although unclear about what will happen, the following quote reflects the general superstition about hyenas: "When bad news is coming, he says, the hyenas cry. It is hard to find a Harari person skeptical of this claim. "

Among the southern Omotic language-speaking community, mingi is a type of superstition that asserts that children born with physical abnormalities, including the top teeth coming in before the bottom teeth, are cursed. These children were killed by drowning, suffocation, strangulation, or by leaving the infants in the forest. In July 2012, the Bari people officially banned the practice of infanticide but retained the belief.

== Zār ==
Belief in Zār (evil spirits) is widely prevalent in Ethiopia, though many Ethiopian also believe in benevolent, protective spirits or adbar. Zār is also practiced by Beta Israel, the Ethiopian diaspora living in North America and Europe, and northern Ethiopian Amhara people with its center in Gondar. Zār is believed to have its origin in Harar.

Dr. Simon Messing, a sociologist who did his work in northwestern Ethiopia (Gondar) in 1953–1954, collected 80 essays on beliefs representing 13 provinces of Ethiopia of 80 students of Haile Selassie I University.
