= Birth =

Process of bearing offspring

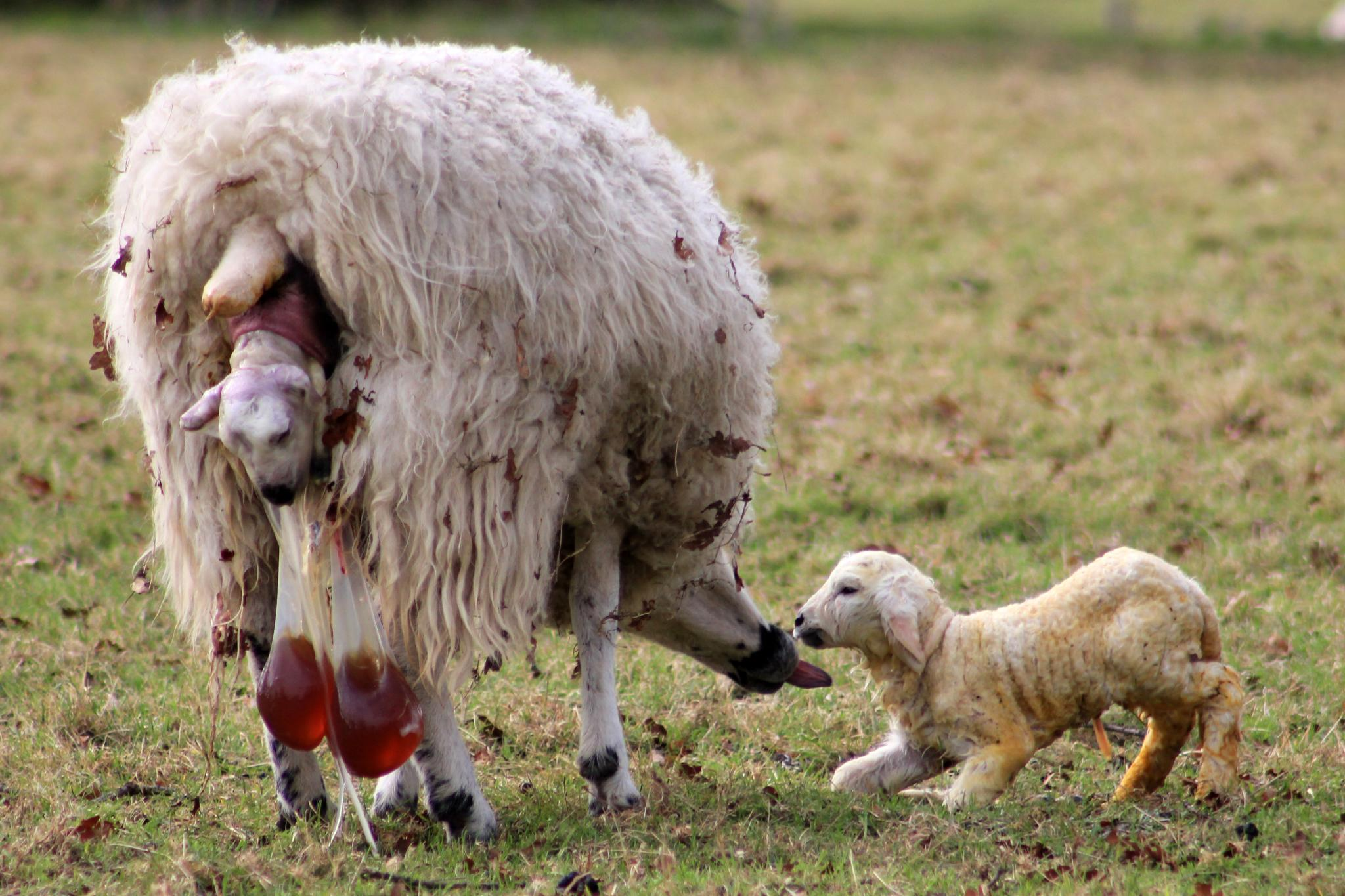
Lambing: the mother licks the first lamb while giving birth to the second

Birth is the act or process of bearing or bringing forth offspring, also referred to in technical contexts as parturition. In mammals, the process is initiated by hormones which cause the muscular walls of the uterus to contract, expelling the fetus at a developmental stage when it is ready to feed and breathe. In humans, this process is known as childbirth.

In some species, the offspring is precocial and can move around almost immediately after birth but in others, it is altricial and completely dependent on parenting.

In marsupials, the fetus is born at a very immature stage after a short gestation and develops further in its mother's womb pouch.

It is not only mammals that give birth. Some reptiles, amphibians, fish and invertebrates carry their developing young inside them. Some of these are ovoviviparous, with the eggs being hatched inside the mother's body, and others are viviparous, with the embryo developing inside their body, as in the case of mammals.

== Human childbirth ==
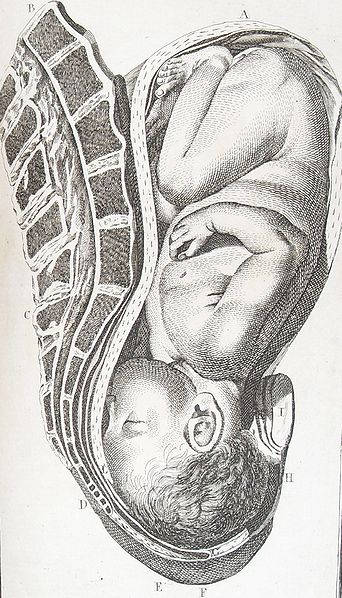
An illustration of normal head-first presentation by the obstetrician William Smellie from about 1792. The membranes have ruptured and the cervix is fully dilated.

Humans usually produce a single offspring at a time. The mother's body is prepared for birth by hormones produced by the pituitary gland, the ovary and the placenta. The total gestation period from fertilization to birth is normally about 38 weeks (birth usually occurring 40 weeks after the last menstrual period). The normal process of childbirth takes several hours and has three stages. The first stage starts with a series of involuntary contractions of the muscular walls of the uterus and gradual dilation of the cervix. The active phase of the first stage starts when the cervix is dilated more than about 4 cm in diameter and is when the contractions become stronger and regular. The head (or the buttocks in a breech birth) of the baby is pushed against the cervix, which gradually dilates until it is fully dilated at 10 cm diameter. At some time, the amniotic sac bursts and the amniotic fluid escapes (also known as rupture of membranes or breaking the water). In stage two, starting when the cervix is fully dilated, strong contractions of the uterus and active pushing by the mother expels the baby out through the vagina, which during this stage of labour is called a birth canal as this passage contains a baby, and the baby is born with umbilical cord attached. In stage three, which begins after the birth of the baby, further contractions expel the placenta, amniotic sac, and the remaining portion of the umbilical cord usually within a few minutes.

Enormous changes take place in the newborn's circulation to enable breathing in air. In the uterus, the fetus is dependent on circulation of blood through the placenta for sustenance including gaseous exchange and the unborn baby's blood bypasses the lungs by flowing through the foramen ovale, which is a hole in the septum dividing the right atrium and left atrium. After birth the umbilical cord is clamped and cut, the baby starts to breathe air, and blood from the right ventricle starts to flow to the lungs for gaseous exchange and oxygenated blood returns to the left atrium, which is pumped into the left ventricle, and then pumped into the main arterial system. As a result of these changes, the blood pressure in the left atrium exceeds the pressure in the right atrium, and this pressure difference forces the foramen ovale to close separating the left and right sides of the heart. The umbilical vein, umbilical arteries, ductus venosus and ductus arteriosus are not needed for life in air and in time these vessels become ligaments (embryonic remnants).

== Other mammals ==
Large mammals, such as primates, cattle, horses, some antelopes, giraffes, hippopotamuses, rhinoceroses, elephants, seals, whales, dolphins, and porpoises, generally are pregnant with one offspring at a time, although they may have twin or multiple births on occasion.

In these large animals, this process is similar to human childbirth, though in most the offspring is precocial. This means that it is born in a more advanced state than a human baby and is able to stand, walk and run (or swim in the case of an aquatic mammal) shortly after birth.

In the case of whales, dolphins and porpoises, the single calf is normally born tail first which minimizes the risk of drowning. The mother encourages the newborn calf to rise to the surface of the water to breathe.

Large mammals which give birth to twins is much more rare, but it does occur occasionally even for mammals as large as elephants. In April 2018, approximately 8-month old elephant twins were sighted joining their mother's herd in the Tarangire National Park of Tanzania, estimated to have been born in August 2017.

=== Cattle ===
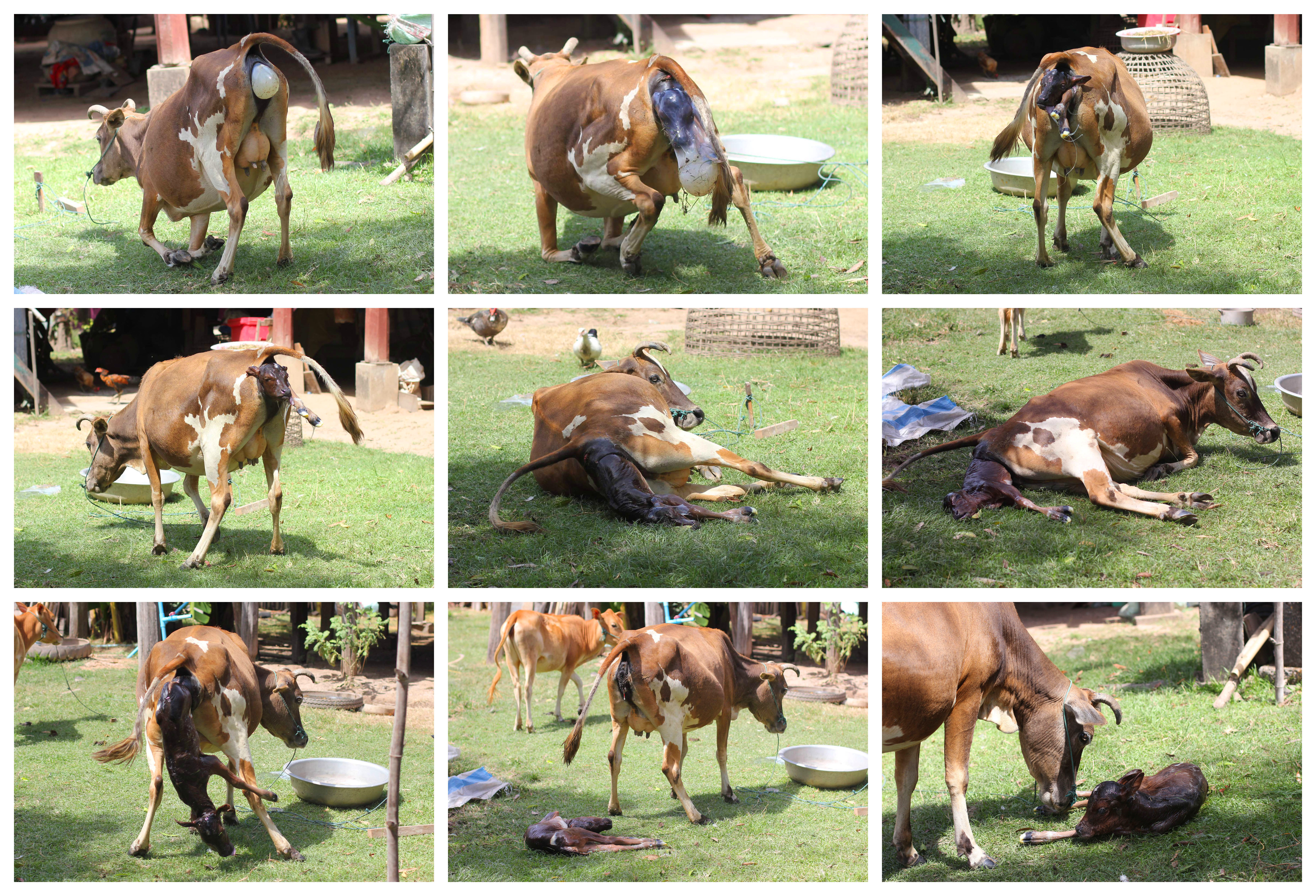
A cow giving birth

Birthing in cattle is typical of a larger mammal. A cow goes through three stages of labor during normal delivery of a calf. During stage one, the animal seeks a quiet place away from the rest of the herd. Hormone changes cause soft tissues of the birth canal to relax as the mother's body prepares for birth. The contractions of the uterus are not obvious externally, but the cow may be restless. She may appear agitated, alternating between standing and lying down, with her tail slightly raised and her back arched. The fetus is pushed toward the birth canal by each contraction and the cow's cervix gradually begins to dilate. Stage one may last several hours, and ends when the cervix is fully dilated. Stage two can be seen to be underway when there is external protrusion of the amniotic sac through the vulva, closely followed by the appearance of the calf's front hooves and head in a front presentation (or occasionally the calf's tail and rear end in a posterior presentation). During the second stage, the cow will usually lie down on her side to push and the calf progresses through the birth canal. The complete delivery of the calf (or calves in a multiple birth) signifies the end of stage two. The cow scrambles to her feet (if lying down at this stage), turns round and starts vigorously licking the calf. The calf takes its first few breaths and within minutes is struggling to rise to its feet. The third and final stage of labor is the delivery of the placenta, which is usually expelled within a few hours and is often eaten by the normally herbivorous cow.

=== Dogs ===
Birth is termed whelping in dogs. Among dogs, as whelping approaches, contractions become more frequent. Labour in the bitch can be divided into 3 stages. The first stage is when the cervix dilates, causing discomfort and restlessness in the dog. Common signs of this stage are panting, fasting, and/or vomiting. This may last up to 12 hours. Stage two is the passage of the offspring. The amniotic sac looking like a glistening grey balloon, with a puppy inside, is propelled through the vulva. After further contractions, the sac is expelled and the bitch breaks the membranes, releasing clear fluid and exposing the puppy. The mother chews at the umbilical cord and licks the puppy vigorously, which stimulates it to breathe. If the puppy has not taken its first breath within about six minutes, it is likely to die. Further puppies follow in a similar way one by one usually with less straining than the first usually at 15-60-minute intervals. If a pup has not been passed in 2 hours a veterinarian should be contacted. Stage three is the passing of the placentas. This often occurs in conjunction with stage two with the passing of each offspring. The mother will then usually eat the afterbirth. This is an adaption to keep the den clean and prevent its detection by predators.

=== Marsupials ===
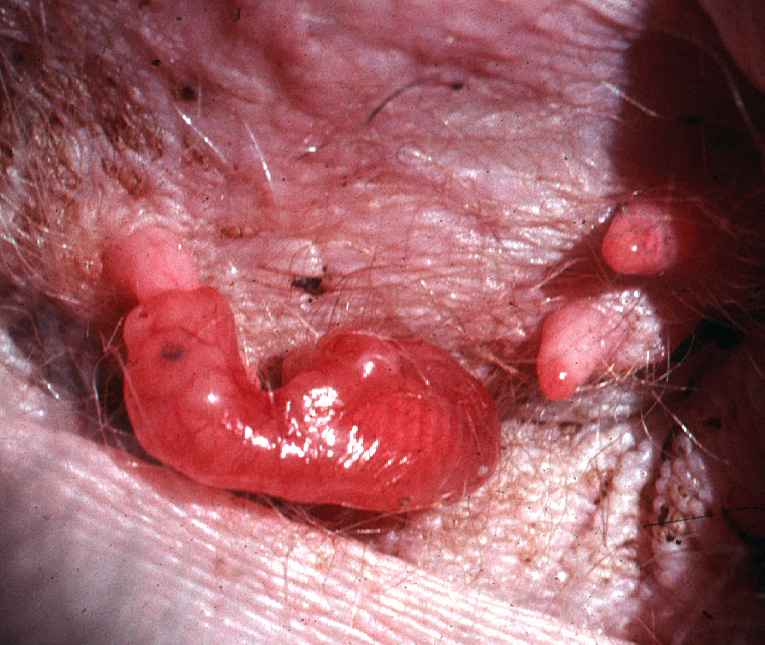
A kangaroo joey firmly attached to a nipple inside the pouch

An infant marsupial is born in a very immature state. The gestation period is usually shorter than the intervals between oestrus periods. The first sign that a birth is imminent is the mother cleaning out her pouch. When it is born, the infant is pink, blind, furless and a few centimetres long. It has nostrils in order to breathe and forelegs to cling onto its mother's hairs but its hind legs are undeveloped. It crawls through its mother's fur and makes its way into the pouch. Here it fixes onto a teat which swells inside its mouth. It stays attached to the teat for several months until it is sufficiently developed to emerge. Joeys are born with "oral shields"; in species without pouches or with rudimentary pouches these are more developed than in forms with well-developed pouches, implying a role in maintaining the young attached to the mother's nipple.

== Other animals ==
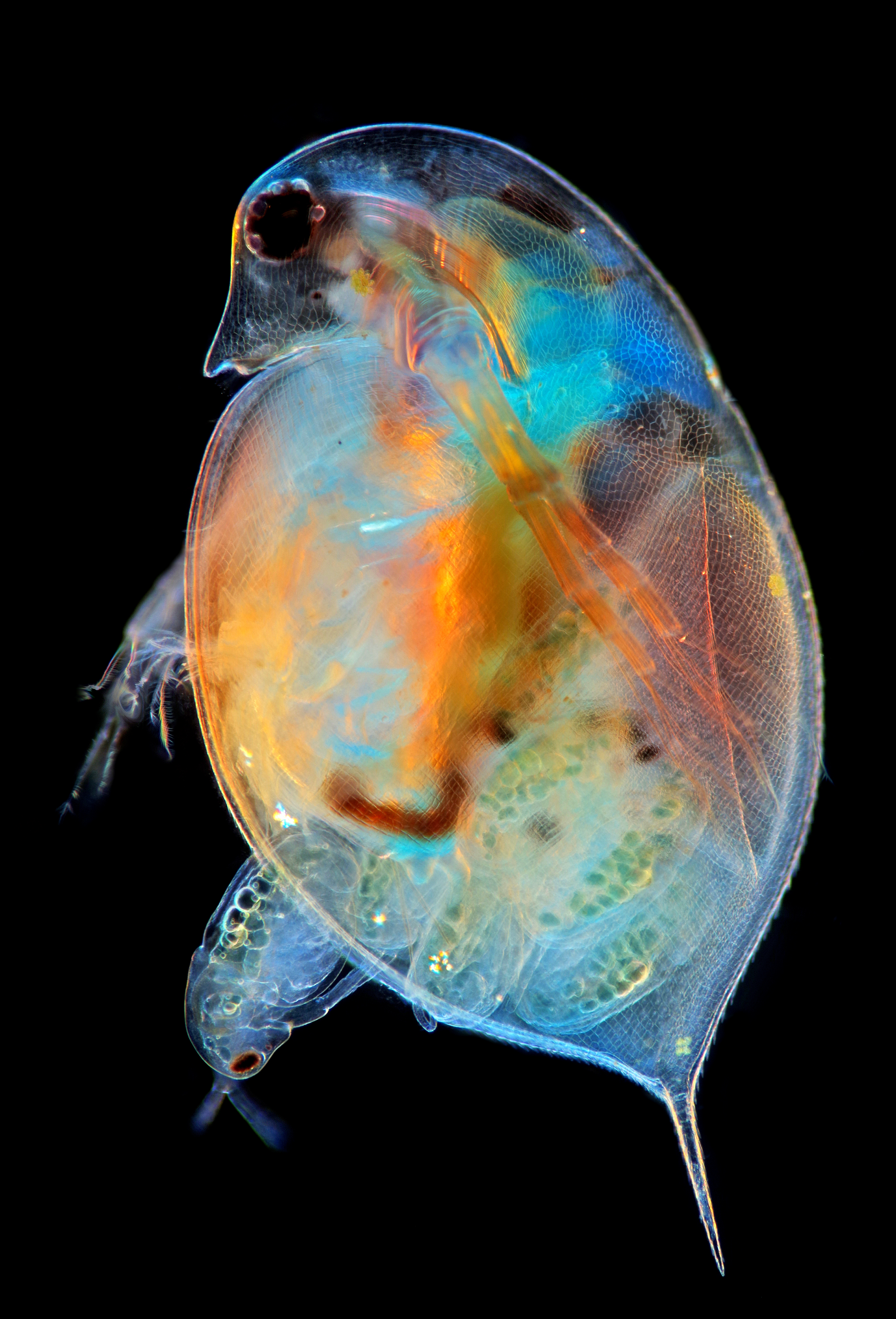
A Cladocera giving birth (100x magnification)

Many reptiles and the vast majority of invertebrates, most fish, amphibians and all birds are oviparous, that is, they lay eggs with little or no embryonic development taking place within the mother. In aquatic organisms, fertilization is nearly always external with sperm and eggs being liberated into the water (an exception is sharks and rays, which have internal fertilization). Millions of eggs may be produced with no further parental involvement, in the expectation that a small number may survive to become mature individuals. Terrestrial invertebrates may also produce large numbers of eggs, a few of which may avoid predation and carry on the species. Some fish, reptiles, and amphibians have adopted a different strategy and invest their effort in producing a small number of young at a more advanced stage which are more likely to survive to adulthood. Birds care for their young in the nest and provide for their needs after hatching and it is perhaps unsurprising that internal development does not occur in birds, given their need to fly.

Ovoviviparity is a mode of reproduction in which embryos develop inside eggs that remain in the mother's body until they are ready to hatch. Ovoviviparous animals are similar to viviparous species in that there is internal fertilization and the young are born in an advanced state, but differ in that there is no placental connection and the unborn young are nourished by egg yolk. The mother's body provides gas exchange (respiration), but that is largely necessary for oviparous animals as well. In many sharks the eggs hatch in the oviduct within the mother's body and the embryos are nourished by the egg's yolk and fluids secreted by glands in the walls of the oviduct. The Lamniforme sharks practice oophagy, where the first embryos to hatch consume the remaining eggs and sand tiger shark pups cannibalistically consume neighbouring embryos. The requiem sharks maintain a placental link to the developing young, this practice is known as viviparity. This is more analogous to mammalian gestation than to that of other fishes. In all these cases, the young are born alive and fully functional. The majority of caecilians are ovoviviparous and give birth to already developed offspring. When the young have finished their yolk sacs they feed on nutrients secreted by cells lining the oviduct and even the cells themselves which they eat with specialist scraping teeth. The Alpine salamander (Salamandra atra) and several species of Tanzanian toad in the genus Nectophrynoides are ovoviviparous, developing through the larval stage inside the mother's oviduct and eventually emerging as fully formed juveniles.

A more developed form of viviparity called placental viviparity is adopted by some species of scorpions and cockroaches, certain genera of sharks, snakes and velvet worms. In these, the developing embryo is nourished by some form of placental structure. The earliest known placenta was found recently in a group of extinct fishes called placoderms. A fossil from Australia's Gogo Formation, laid down in the Devonian period, 380 million years ago, was found with an embryo inside it connected by an umbilical cord to a yolk sac. The find confirmed the hypothesis that a sub-group of placoderms, called ptyctodontids, fertilized their eggs internally. Some fishes that fertilize their eggs internally also give birth to live young, as seen here. This discovery moved our knowledge of live birth back 200 million years. The fossil of another genus was found with three embryos in the same position. Placoderms are a sister group of the ancestor of all living jawed fishes (Gnathostomata), including both chondrichthyans, the sharks & rays, and Osteichthyes, the bony fishes.

Among lizards, the viviparous lizard Zootoca vivipara, the Jackson's chameleon, slow worms and many species of skink are viviparous, giving birth to live young. Some are ovoviviparous but others such as members of the genera Tiliqua and Corucia, give birth to live young that develop internally, deriving their nourishment from a mammal-like placenta attached to the inside of the mother's uterus. In a recently described example, an African species, Trachylepis ivensi, has developed a purely reptilian placenta directly comparable in structure and function to a mammalian placenta. Vivipary is rare in snakes, but boas and vipers are viviparous, giving birth to live young.

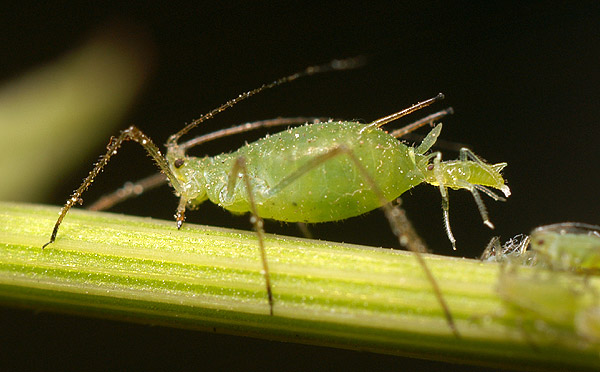
Female aphid giving birth

The majority of insects lay eggs but a very few give birth to offspring that are miniature versions of the adult. The aphid has a complex life cycle and during the summer months is able to multiply with great rapidity. Its reproduction is typically parthenogenetic and viviparous and females produce unfertilized eggs which they retain within their bodies. The embryos develop within their mothers' ovarioles and the offspring are clones of their mothers. Female nymphs are born which grow rapidly and soon produce more female offspring themselves. In some instances, the newborn nymphs already have developing embryos inside them.

== See also ==
- Animal sexual behaviour
- Breeding season
- Caesarean section
- Dystocia
- Episiotomy
- Foaling (horses)
- Forceps delivery
- Kegel exercises
- Mating system
- Odon device
- Perineal massage
- Reproduction
- Reproductive system
- Ventouse
- Birth spacing

== Cited texts ==
- "Intrapartum care: Care of healthy women and their babies during childbirth". NICE. September 2007. Archived from the original on 2014-04-26.
