= Husband stitch =

Excessive surgical repair of perineal birth damage

The husband stitch or husband's stitch, also known as the daddy stitch, husband's knot, or vaginal tuck, is a surgical procedure in which one or more additional sutures than necessary are used to repair a woman's perineum after it has been torn or cut during childbirth. (Note: "Vaginal tightening surgery has been around since the mid fifties, where gynecologists used to tighten the entrance of a woman's vagina with an extra stitch while repairing vaginal and perineum tears or episiotomies after giving birth. At that time it was notoriously known as the 'husband's stitch', the 'husband's knot', or the 'vaginal tuck', and doctors discreetly referred to this procedure as 'improving a woman's well-being'.") The purported purpose is to tighten the opening of the vagina and thereby enhance the pleasure of the patient's male sex partner during penetrative intercourse.

== Medical perspective ==
While repair of the perineum may be medically necessary, an extra stitch is not, and may cause discomfort or pain. Use of the term in the medical literature can be traced to Transactions of the Texas State Medical Association in 1885, where a doctor claimed to have performed one.

Dr. Geo. Cupples was called upon to explain the "Husband Stitch," which he did as follows: He said that when he was stitching up a ruptured perineum, of a married lady, the husband was an anxious and interested observer, and when he had taken all the stitches necessary, the husband peeped over his shoulders and said, "Dr., can't you take another stitch?" and he did, and called it the "Husband Stitch".

The term is also referenced in What Women Want to Know (1958), (Note: "Such a problem confronted a colleague of mine, whose pregnant patient asked him before delivery if he would please put in what she referred to as 'her husband's stitch'. It turned out that she wanted him to tighten up her vagina somewhat, so that it would revert to its original state. The doctor took her at her word and, following delivery of her fourth baby, performed a perineorrhaphy. This operation has the effect of tightening the sphincter and rendering the introitus somewhat smaller. "Unhappily, the patient and her husband decided that the 'stitch' had been made too tight, was unsatisfactory, and sued the doctor for malpractice, asking something in the neighborhood of a hundred thousand dollars. The doctor won his case, though not without difficulty, and it was a genuine legal battle despite the humorous implications of the issue.") and in The Year After Childbirth: Surviving and Enjoying the First Year of Motherhood, written by Sheila Kitzinger in 1994.

Some medical practitioners have asserted that the procedure is mostly an urban legend, and false attribution, while others have claimed to know doctors who perform the procedure. The American College of Obstetricians and Gynecologists, according to a report by Fatherly, does not deny that the procedure happens but alleges that it "is not standard or common". Other doctors, such as Jean Marty, head of the Union of Gynecologists in France, have claimed that the idea of a husband stitch comes from botched episiotomies and poor stitching, that lead women to have pain during sexual intercourse and while urinating.

However, there are several accounts of women who claim to have undergone this procedure without their consent. There have been several journalistic investigations on the existence of the husband stitch, trying to determine if it was real. They have overwhelmingly determined that the practice does exist, as seen in reports by Chelsea Ritschel, by Kaitlin Reilly for Yahoo! Life, by Anam Alam to Thred, and in reports from French newspapers Grazia, and Le Monde.

Belgian researchers Julie Dobbeleir, Koenraad Van Landuyt and Stan J. Monstrey have studied the practice, finding evidence of it happening in Belgium at least since the 1950s:

Vaginal tightening surgery has been around since the mid-fifties, where gynecologists used to tighten the entrance of a woman's vagina with an extra stitch while repairing vaginal and perineum tears or episiotomies after giving birth. At that time it was notoriously known as the "husband's stitch," the "husband's knot," or the "vaginal tuck," and doctors discreetly referred to this procedure as "improving a woman's well-being."

The husband stitch has also been referenced in a 2004 study about the abuse of episiotomies in São Paulo:

Professionals we have interviewed often mention the ponto do marido (husband's stitch), intended to make the vaginal opening even tighter after delivery. Frequent complications are vulval and vaginal pain, scarring problems, and deformities that need further surgical correction. Long-term consequences for sexual relations of episiotomy need further study.

Similarly, in Cambodia, the practice has been linked to high rates of episiotomy:

A study in the NIH database found that the continued use of episiotomies in Cambodia was due to many doctors' belief that they would provide women with a 'tighter and prettier vagina' if they gave her an episiotomy.

== Popular culture ==
A short story by Carmen Maria Machado, "The Husband Stitch", first published in 2014 in Granta and later published in the collection Her Body and Other Parties, describes a woman undergoing the procedure.
