= Anogenital distance =

Distance from midpoint of the anus to the genitalia

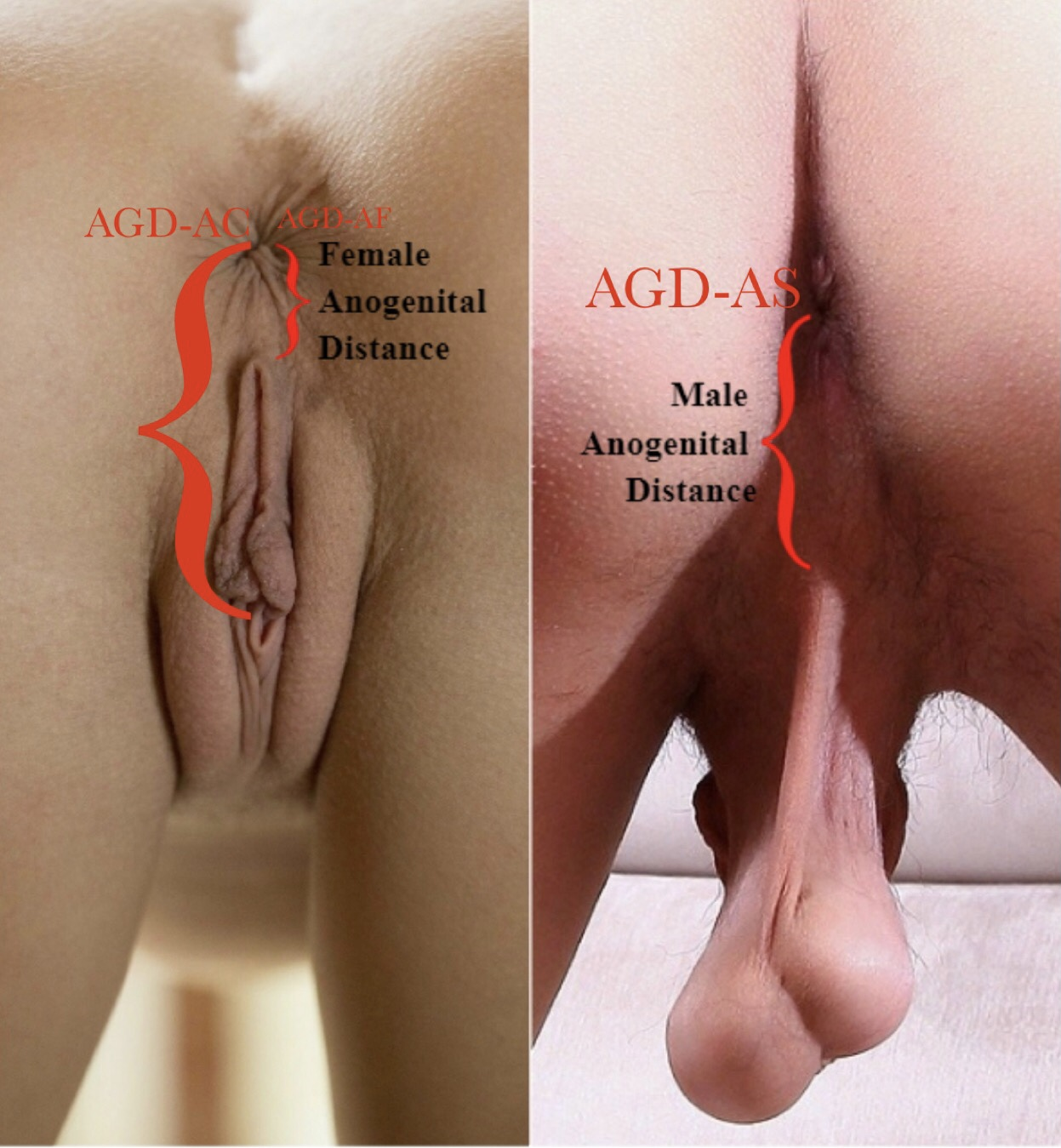
Anogenital distance of human female and male

Anogenital distance (AGD) is the distance from the midpoint of the anus to the genitalia, the underside of the vagina, the clitoris or the scrotum. It is considered medically significant for a number of reasons, in both humans and other animals, including sex determination and as a marker of endocrine disruptor exposure. It is regulated by dihydrotestosterone, which can be disrupted by phthalates common in plastics.

The anogenital index (AGI) is an index used to compare the AGD relative to a model based on body weight. It is computed as the AGD divided by weight [AGI = AGD/weight (mm/kg)].

== Measurement ==
The AGD is usually measured as follows: from the center of the anus to the posterior convergence of the fourchette (where the vestibule begins) in females (AGD-AF); and from the center of the anus to the junction of the smooth perineal skin with the rugate skin of the scrotum in males (AGD-AS). An alternative measurement, AGD-AC, defined only in females, is measured from the anus to the clitoris.

== In humans ==
Early studies showed that the human perineum was half as long in females as in males, but it has since been found to be three quarters the male distance in females, although males have more variance. Measuring the anogenital distance in neonatal humans has been suggested as a noninvasive method to determine male feminisation and female virilization and thereby predict neonatal and adult reproductive disorders.

A study by Swan et al. determined that the AGD is linked to fertility in males, and penis size. Males with a short AGD (lower than the median around 52 mm (2 in)) have seven times the chance of being sub-fertile as those with a longer AGD. It is linked to both semen volume and sperm count. A lower than median AGD also increases the likelihood of undescended testes, and lowered sperm counts and testicular tumors in adulthood. Babies with high total exposure to phthalates were ninety times more likely to have a short AGD, despite not every type of the nine phthalates tested being correlated with shorter AGD.

Swan et al. report that the levels of phthalates associated with significant AGD reductions are found in approximately one-quarter of Americans tested by the Centers for Disease Control and Prevention (CDC) for phthalate body burdens.

Women who had high levels of phthalates in their urine during pregnancy gave birth to sons who were ten times more likely to have shorter than expected AGDs.

A 2018 study by Barrett et al. found that infant girls born to women with polyendocrine metabolic ovarian syndrome (PMOS) had longer AGD, suggesting higher fetal testosterone exposure, than girls born to women without PMOS.

=== Conditions ===
Hypospadias and cryptorchidism are conditions which may be induced in males with short AGD. Other problems in males include risk of testicular dysgenesis syndrome.

== In other animals ==
There have been extensive studies of AGD effects on animals. In some animals, it is routinely measured to determine health.

Experiments have demonstrated that in rodent studies this distance is shortened when the mother is exposed to chemicals that are anti-androgenic, such as dibutyl phthalate (DBP) or benzyl butyl phthalate (BBzP).

Bisphenol A in certain doses increases the AGD of both genders of a study on mice.

In 2017, Gobikrushanth et al. studied the relationship between AGD (the distance from the center of the anus to the base of the vagina and the clitoris) and fertility in Canadian Holstein cows. They found that in first and second parity cows an increase in AGD has an inverse correlation with pregnancy success after first artificial insemination. This correlation was not found in third+ parity cows.

== See also ==
- Digit ratio
- Waist–hip ratio
