= Perineal tear =

- Other names: Latin: Laceratio perinei
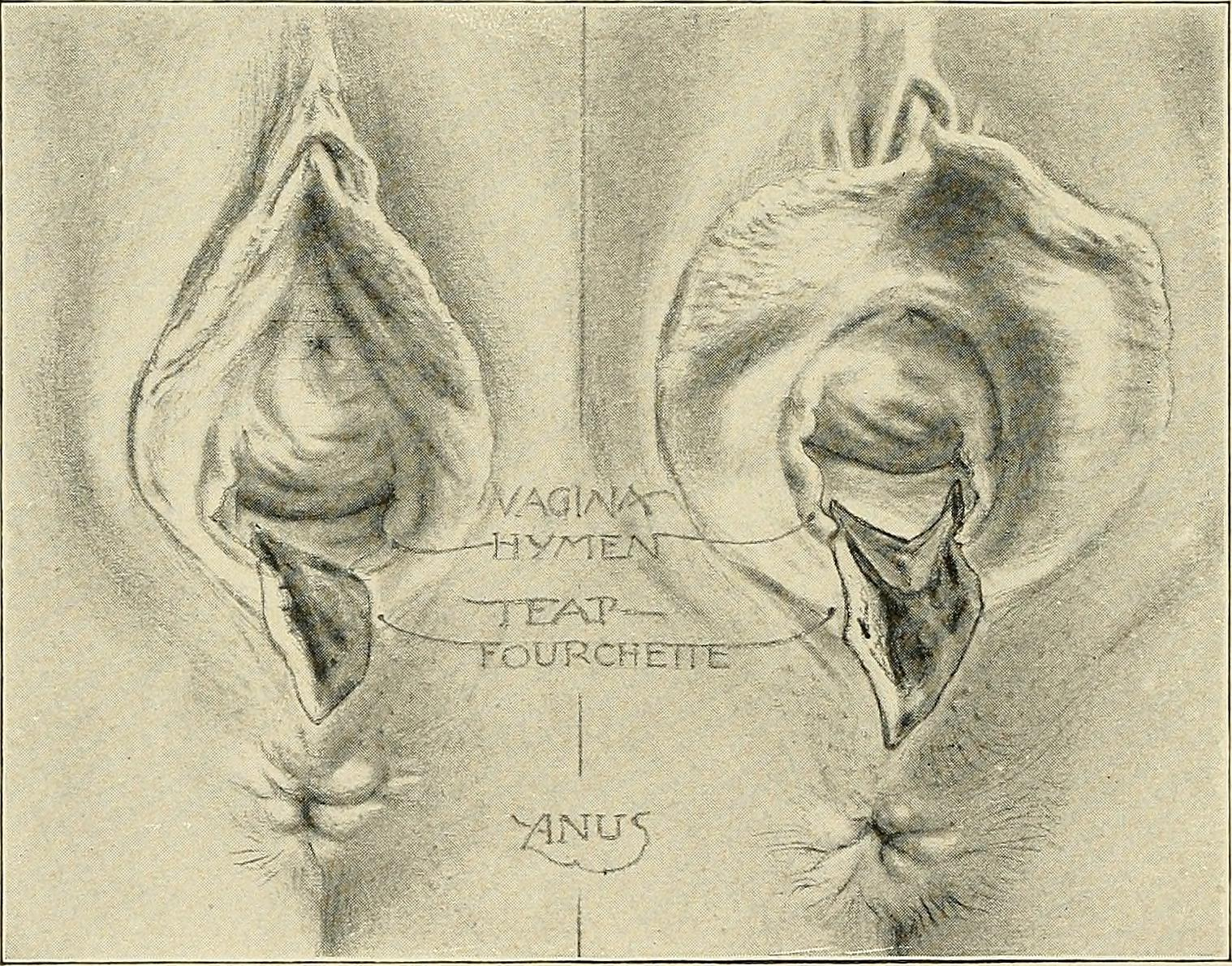
- Illustration of two perineal tears
- Specialty: Obstetrics

A perineal tear is a laceration of the skin and other soft tissue structures which, in women, separate the vagina from the anus. Perineal tears mainly occur in women as a result of vaginal childbirth, which strains the perineum. It is the most common form of obstetric injury. Tears vary widely in severity. The majority are superficial and may require no treatment, but severe tears can cause significant bleeding, long-term pain or dysfunction. A perineal tear is distinct from an episiotomy, in which the perineum is intentionally incised to facilitate delivery. Episiotomy, a very rapid birth, or large fetal size can lead to more severe tears which may require surgical intervention.

== Anatomy ==
In women, an anatomical area known as the perineum separates the opening of the vagina from that of the anus. Each opening is surrounded by a wall, and the anal wall is separated from the vaginal wall by a mass of soft tissue including:

- The muscles of the anus (corrugator cutis ani, the internal anal sphincter and the external anal sphincter)
- The medial muscles of the urogenital region (the superficial transverse perineal muscle, the deep transverse perineal muscle and bulbocavernosus)
- The medial levator ani muscles (puborectalis and pubococcygeus)
- The fascia of perineum, which covers these muscles
- The overlying skin and subcutaneous tissue

A perineal tear may involve some or all of these structures, which normally aid in supporting the pelvic organs and maintaining faecal continence.

== Classification ==
Tears are classified into four categories:

- First-degree tear: laceration is limited to the fourchette and superficial perineal skin or vaginal mucosa
- Second-degree tear: laceration extends beyond fourchette, perineal skin and vaginal mucosa to perineal muscles and fascia, but not the anal sphincter
- Third-degree tear: fourchette, perineal skin, vaginal mucosa, muscles, and anal sphincter are torn; third-degree tears may be further subdivided into three subcategories:
  - 3a: partial tear of the external anal sphincter involving less than 50% thickness
  - 3b: greater than 50% tear of the external anal sphincter
  - 3c: internal sphincter is torn
- Fourth-degree tear: fourchette, perineal skin, vaginal mucosa, muscles, anal sphincter, and rectal mucosa are torn
- Button-hole tear: the tear involves rectal mucosa with an intact anal sphincter complex

== Cause ==
In humans and some other primates, the head of the term fetus is so large in comparison to the size of the birth canal that delivery may result in some degree of trauma. As the head passes through the pelvis, the soft tissues are stretched and compressed. The risk of severe tear is greatly increased if the fetal head is oriented occiput posterior (face forward), if the mother has not given birth before or if the fetus is large.

A surgical incision on the perineum skin called an episiotomy was historically used routinely in order to reduce perineal tears. However, its routine use has declined as there is some evidence it increases the severity of tears when it is not indicated. A Cochrane review found that routine use of episiotomy increased the incidence of severe perineal tears by 30%.

Several other techniques are used to reduce the risk of tearing, but with little evidence for efficacy. Antenatal digital perineal massage is often advocated, and may reduce the risk of trauma only in nulliparous women. Hands-on techniques employed by midwives, in which the foetal head is guided through the vagina at a controlled rate have been widely advocated, but their efficacy is unclear. Water birth and labouring in water are popular for several reasons, and it has been suggested that by softening the perineum they might reduce the rate of tearing. However, this effect has never been clearly demonstrated.

== Prevention and treatment ==
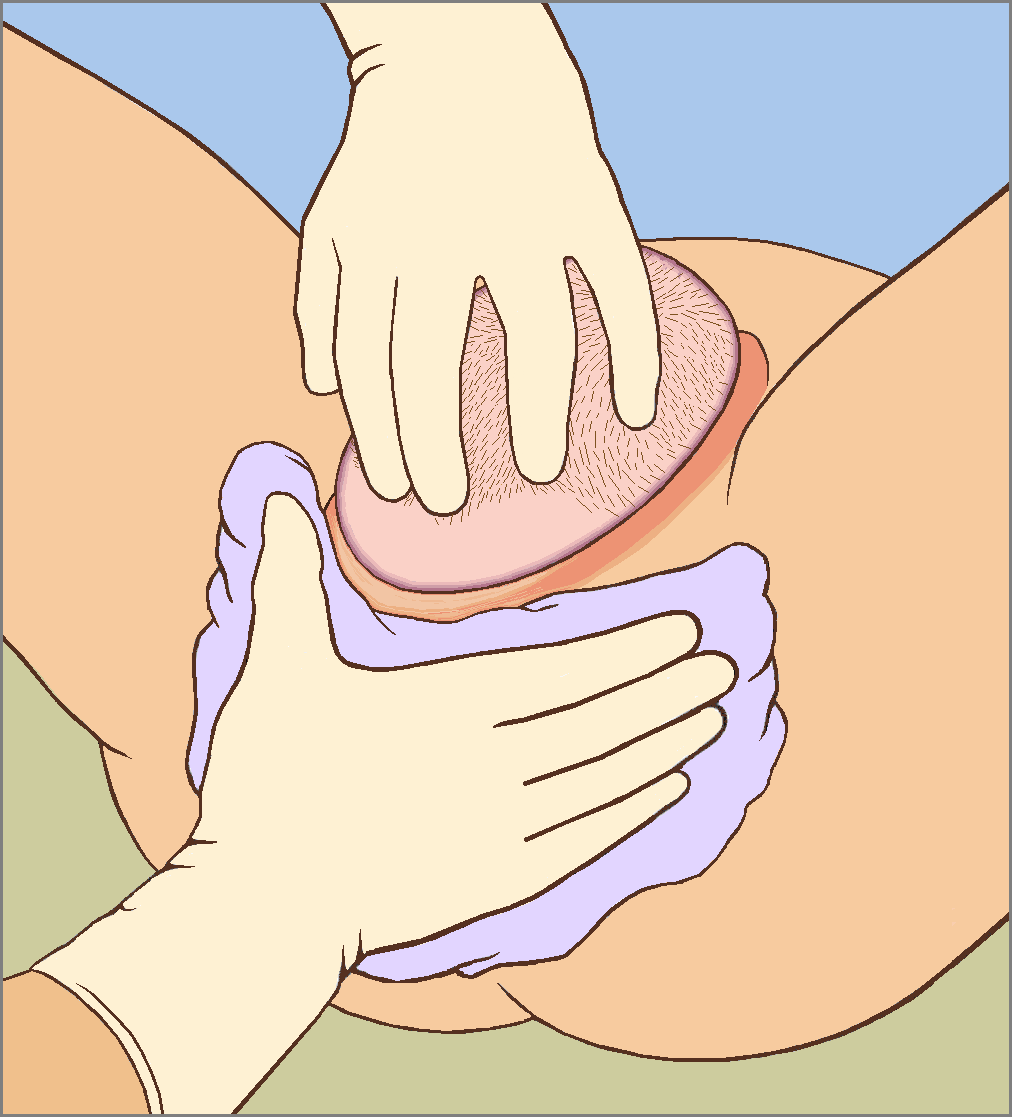
Perineal protection during the birth of the head

Perineal protection is an obstetric measure to prevent the perineal tissue from tearing (perineal tear) during the birth of the baby's head or to keep the extent of the injury as small as possible. The midwife (or obstetrician) supports the perineal tissue with one hand as soon as the head stretches. The other hand rests on the baby's head and regulates its speed of passage (so-called head brake). At the same time, the woman giving birth is guided to push along slowly and in a well-dosed manner. This allows the head to be born slowly over the perineum, which thus has enough time to stretch. Warm compresses held against the perineum during the second stage of labor can reduce the risk of tearing.

Treatment is to either let the tear heal naturally or to surgically repair it. Third- and fourth-degree tears generally require surgical repair. A Cochrane review of comparing surgical treatment with natural healing of first- and second-degree tears found no to little difference between the two treatment options. The review concluded that there was insufficient evidence to recommend either treatment option over the other for first- and second-degree tears.

== Prevalence ==
A 2008 study found that over 85% of women having a vaginal birth sustain some form of perineal trauma. A retrospective study of 8,603 vaginal deliveries in 1994 found a third-degree tear had been clinically diagnosed in only 50 women (0.6%). However, when the same authors used anal endosonography in a consecutive group of 202 deliveries, there was evidence of third-degree tears in 35% of first-time mothers and 44% of mothers with previous children. These numbers are confirmed by other researchers in 1999.

A study by the Agency for Healthcare Research and Quality (AHRQ) found that in 2011, first- and second-degree perineal tear was the most common complicating condition for vaginal deliveries in the U.S. among women covered by either private insurance or Medicaid.

Second-degree perineal laceration rates were higher for women covered by private insurance than for women covered by Medicaid.

== Complications ==
First- and second-degree tears rarely cause long-term problems. Among women who experience a third- or fourth-degree tear, 60–80% are asymptomatic after 12 months. Faecal incontinence, faecal urgency, chronic perineal pain, pain with sex, and fistula formation occur in a minority of women, but may be permanent. The symptoms associated with perineal tear are not always due to the tear itself, since there are often other injuries, such as avulsion of pelvic floor muscles, that are not evident on examination.

There are claims that sometimes the perineum is excessively repaired after childbirth using a so-called "husband stitch" and that this can increase vaginal tightness or result in pain during intercourse.
