= Buda (folklore) =

Evil eye in Ethiopian and Eritrean folklore

Buda (Ge'ez: ቡዳ), in Ethiopian and Eritrean folk religion, is the power of the evil eye and the ability to change into a hyena. Buda is a power held and wielded by those in a different social group, for example, among the Beta Israel or metalworkers. The belief is also present in Sudan, Tanzania, and among the Berbers of Morocco.

Belief in the evil eye, or buda, is still widespread in Ethiopia. The Beta Israel, or Ethiopian Jews, are often characterized by others as possessing buda. Other artisan castes, such as blacksmiths are often labelled as bearing the buda., the Amharic word for manual worker, tabib, is also used to denote "one with the evil eye." The alleged evil power of the tabib is believed to be at a level similar to that of witches.

Buda's alleged prevalence among outsiders correlates with the traditional belief that evil eye curses themselves are rooted in envy. As such, those allegedly possessing the power of buda might do so because of malevolent spirits. One study specifies that they are believed to be "empowered by evil spirit". Niall Finneran describes how "the idea of magical creation underpins the perception of artisans in Ethiopia and in the wider African context. In many cases these skills have been acquired originally from an elemental source of evil via the paternal lineage, rather like a Faustian pact." The power of the evil eye allows its bearer to change into a hyena, allowing him or her to attack another person while concealing his or her human identity.

Some Ethiopian and Eritrean Christians carry an amulet or talisman, known as a kitab, or invoke God's name, to ward off the ill effects of buda. A debtera, who is either an unordained priest and/or educated layperson who practices traditional medicine and sometimes magic, creates these protective amulets or talismans.

Ordained Ethiopian Orthodox priests also continue to intervene and perform exorcisms on behalf of those believed to be afflicted by demons or buda. Such persons are brought to a church or prayer meeting. Amsalu Geleta, in a modern case study, relates elements that are common to Ethiopian Christian exorcisms:

It includes singing praise and victory songs, reading from the Scripture, prayer and confronting the spirit in the name of Jesus. Dialogue with the spirit is another important part of the exorcism ceremony. It helps the counselor (exorcist) to know how the spirit was operating in the life of the demoniac. The signs and events mentioned by the spirit are affirmed by the victim after deliverance.

The exorcism is not always successful, and Geleta notes another instance in which the usual methods were unsuccessful, and the demons left the subject at a later time. In any event, "in all cases the spirit is commanded in no other name than the name of Jesus."

== See also ==
- Zār
- Superstition in Ethiopia
