= Frenulum of labia minora =

Anatomical feature

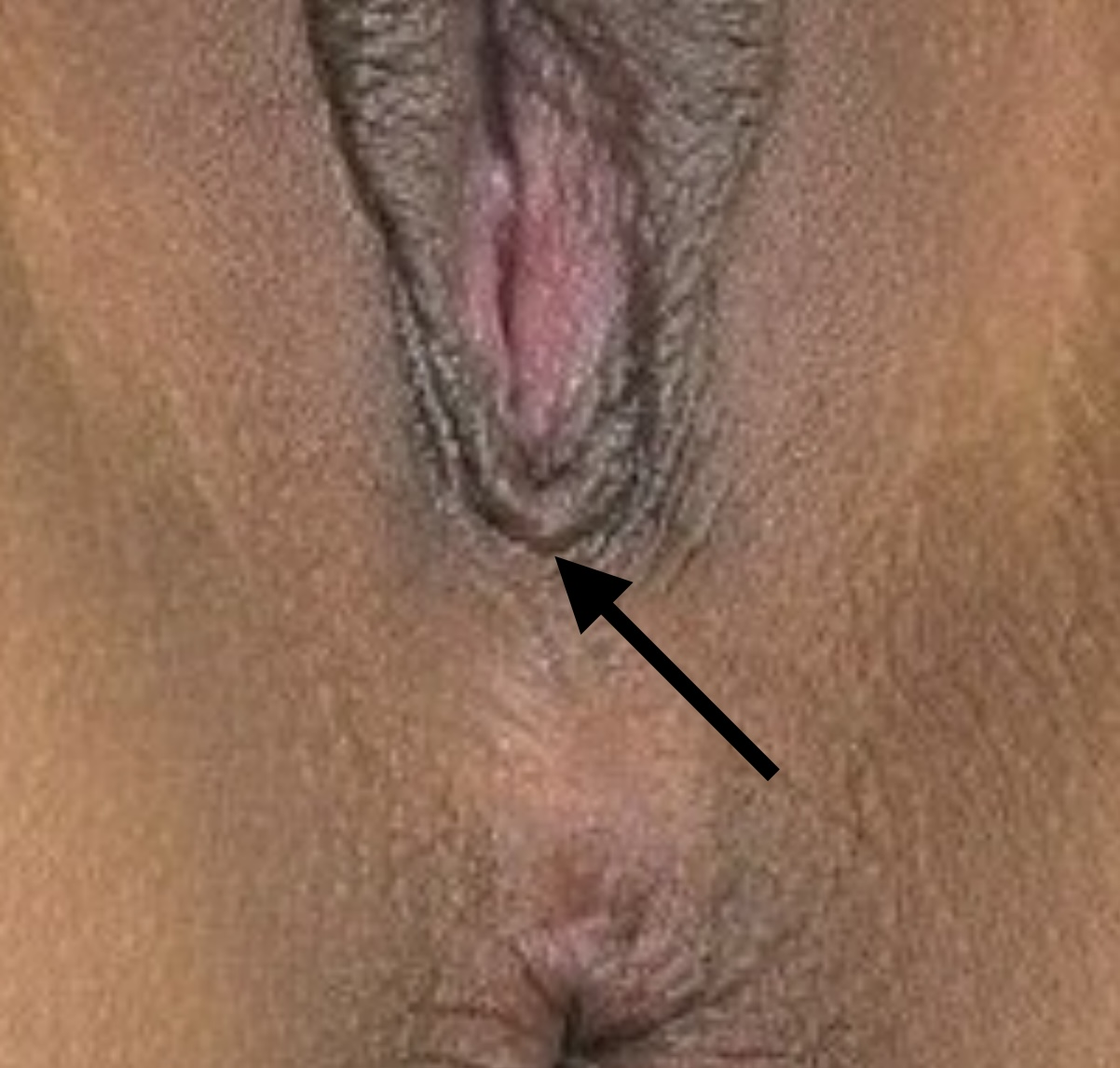
- A vulva with the labia minora drawn apart and arrow pointing at the frenulum

Details

Identifiers
- Latin: frenulum labiorum pudendi
- TA98: A09.2.01.008
- TA2: 3554
- FMA: 20404

The frenulum of labia minora (fourchette or posterior commissure of the labia minora) is a frenulum where the labia minora meet posteriorly.

== Pathology ==
The fourchette may be torn during delivery due to the sudden stretching of the vulval orifice, or during copulation. To prevent this tearing in a haphazard manner, obstetricians and, less frequently, midwives may perform an episiotomy, which is a deliberate cut made in the perineum starting from the fourchette and continuing back along the perineum toward the anus. Sometimes this surgical cut may extend to involve the perineal body and thus reduce anal sphincter function. Thus some obstetricians have opted to perform a posterior-lateral cut in the perineum to prevent this potential complication from occurring.

The fourchette may also be torn in acts of violence wherein forced entry occurs, such as rape. When the fourchette is torn, the bleeding which ensues sometimes requires surgical suturing for containment.

== Etymology ==
The fourchette is named with the French word for "fork" or "wishbone", owing to its shape. (See frenulum for its etymology.)

== See also ==
- Clitoral frenulum
- Fourchette piercing
- Perineal tear classification
