= Sobada =

Therapeutic massage

Sobada is a therapeutic massage that was developed in the Central and South America. Sobada is divided into two general categories. One type of sobada, which is done by midwives, helps with the reproductive cycle when a woman is pregnant. The second type of sobada, which is performed by los sobadores, or people who specialize in sobada, helps to reposition organs or parts of the body that are considered out of alignment. Sobada is part of the system of values and is part of the local language. There is a known difference between what sobada is and what a light massage is.

== Prenatal Sobada ==
Sobada is done by the midwife to her pregnant patient during various prenatal visits. The massage is usually done within a greeting, massage and leave taking structure. Depending on the needs of the mother-to-be, certain parts of this structure may be expanded upon. For example, expansions can help relieve particular bodily symptoms as well can be used to help turn a baby around. Sobada is thought by both midwives and mothers to be one of the most important parts of prenatal care for both the baby and the mother. Sobada is also thought to be a way for a woman to take everyday care of their bodies.

The massage begins after formal greetings have been done and the massage is always done in a casual and leisurely style. The midwife will have the woman lie on the ground, usually on top of a blanket and a gunnysack, and have the woman expose her stomach. The midwife will apply either oil or Vaseline to her hands and the woman's stomach and begin the massage. Throughout the massage the midwife will talk with the woman about how she has been feeling and about other details like the expected birthdate.

The first part of the massage is done on the abdomen of the woman. By stroking and probing the abdomen, the midwife can use the massage to help determine the position of the baby and help her decide if it is turned in an unfavorable position or not. The midwife can also estimate the due date of the baby by locating the baby's head and measuring the height of the abdomen with their fingers. The midwife will do a procedure of "lifting the uterus" while massaging the abdomen area. The midwife will do this by pushing their fingers into the side and going underneath the pregnant uterus. The midwife will then pull the uterus towards them. Once this has been done on one side of the woman's body, the midwife will repeat this action on the other side.

The next stage of the sobada massage is done to the woman's back. The midwife will put firm pressure on the woman's back and move their palm down along the woman's spine. The midwife will then have the woman turn so they can do this part of the massage on the other side of the woman's back. The midwife may also massage the woman's calves and thighs by holding the woman's legs up and rubbing in a downwards motion.

In the last stage, the midwife helps the woman stand up. To do this the midwife will raise the woman's knees so that her feet are flat on the ground. The midwife will then take the woman's hands and helps pull her to reach a standing position. After this stage of the massage, the woman is instructed to rest.

=== Potential Advantages of Prenatal Sobada ===
==== Identify a Breech or Transverse Baby ====
One potential benefit a mother can get from the sobada massage is the midwife can determine if a baby is in a breech or transverse position. When the midwife determines this, they may decide to do an inversion (external version). This is when the midwife helps to turn the baby in a head-down position while still in utero. A baby that is in a head-down position is considered to be more favorable. It is also thought that adjusting the baby's position helps make the baby more comfortable. To do this, the midwife will locate the baby's head and hip. Then, by applying strong and even pressure, the midwife is able to shift the baby into a head-down position.

==== Prevent Afterbirth ====
Midwives in the Yucatán believe that by doing the process of "lifting the uterus up", the afterbirth won't stick.

For the mother, it is thought that sobada helps to make the birthing process easier, relieve discomfort and also provide emotional support for the woman through physical contact. For the baby, sobada is thought to help reposition the baby to make it more comfortable.

== Sobada for Manipulation of Organs ==
Sobada is also used to manipulate the position of one's organs. It is believed that everything in the body twists and moves on its own due to events like falling, over exertion and pregnancy. It is also believed that all organs have a specific place and alignment and ones organs must stay in that place to maintain health. People who perform this kind of sobada go through a long apprenticeship and have a strong knowledge of the use of their hands. This kind of sobada is performed on men, women and children.

The person who is receiving this kind of sobada will lie in an isolated part of the house and will have it performed on them early in the morning before they have eaten. The person who is giving the sobada will put an oily solution on their hands and begin the massage by localizing the position of an organ. They will then slowly move the organ back to its correct position and apply pressure over the organ with their thumb or palm of hand. Sometimes a temporary bandage may be put around the person's belly because it is thought to help keep everything in place. The person giving performing the sobada may also decide to massage other parts of the body like the neck, arm, legs and head.

== Prenatal Massages in Other Cultures ==
Biomedical professionals and midwifery training programs have discouraged midwives from doing massages. They are especially concerned about the dangers of external versions. This aspect concerns them because there is a risk the midwife may apply too much pressure and cause detachment of the placenta. It is unknown how often this happens or how many times it has happened.

Many studies have been done to see the potential benefits of massage therapy and pregnancy. Results have further suggested that prenatal massages can reduce depression, anxiety, leg and back pain. Other types of abdominal massages have been used to treat other problems in the body.

Prenatal massage therapy also has been said to have other potential benefits such as:

- Better mood
- Less pain in the back
- Better patterns of sleep
- Less leg pain
- Reduced stress hormone levels
- Reduced complications while in labor
- Less complications for the baby following birth
- Lowered anxiety
- Reduced sciatica pain
