= Perineoplasty =

Plastic surgery procedure

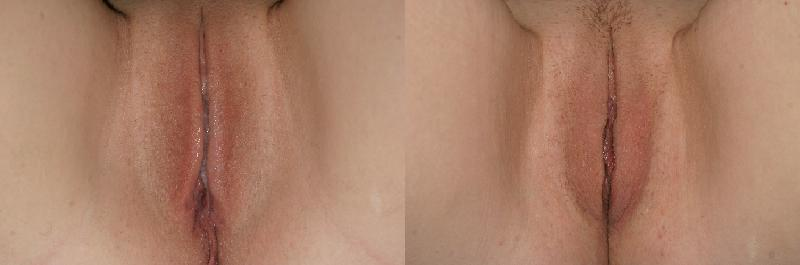
- Perineoplasty: the pre-operative aspect (left), and the post-operative aspect (right) of the surgical correction of the perineum.
- Specialty: Plastic surgery

Perineoplasty (also perineorrhaphy) denotes the plastic surgery procedures used to correct clinical conditions (damage, defect, deformity) of the vagina and the anus. Among the vagino-anal conditions resolved by perineoplasty are vaginal looseness, vaginal itching, damaged perineum, fecal incontinence, genital warts, dyspareunia, vaginal stenosis, vaginismus, vulvar vestibulitis, and decreased sexual sensation. Depending upon the vagino-anal condition to be treated, there are two variants of the perineoplasty procedure: the first, to tighten the perineal muscles and the vagina; the second, to loosen the perineal muscles.

== Surgical correction ==
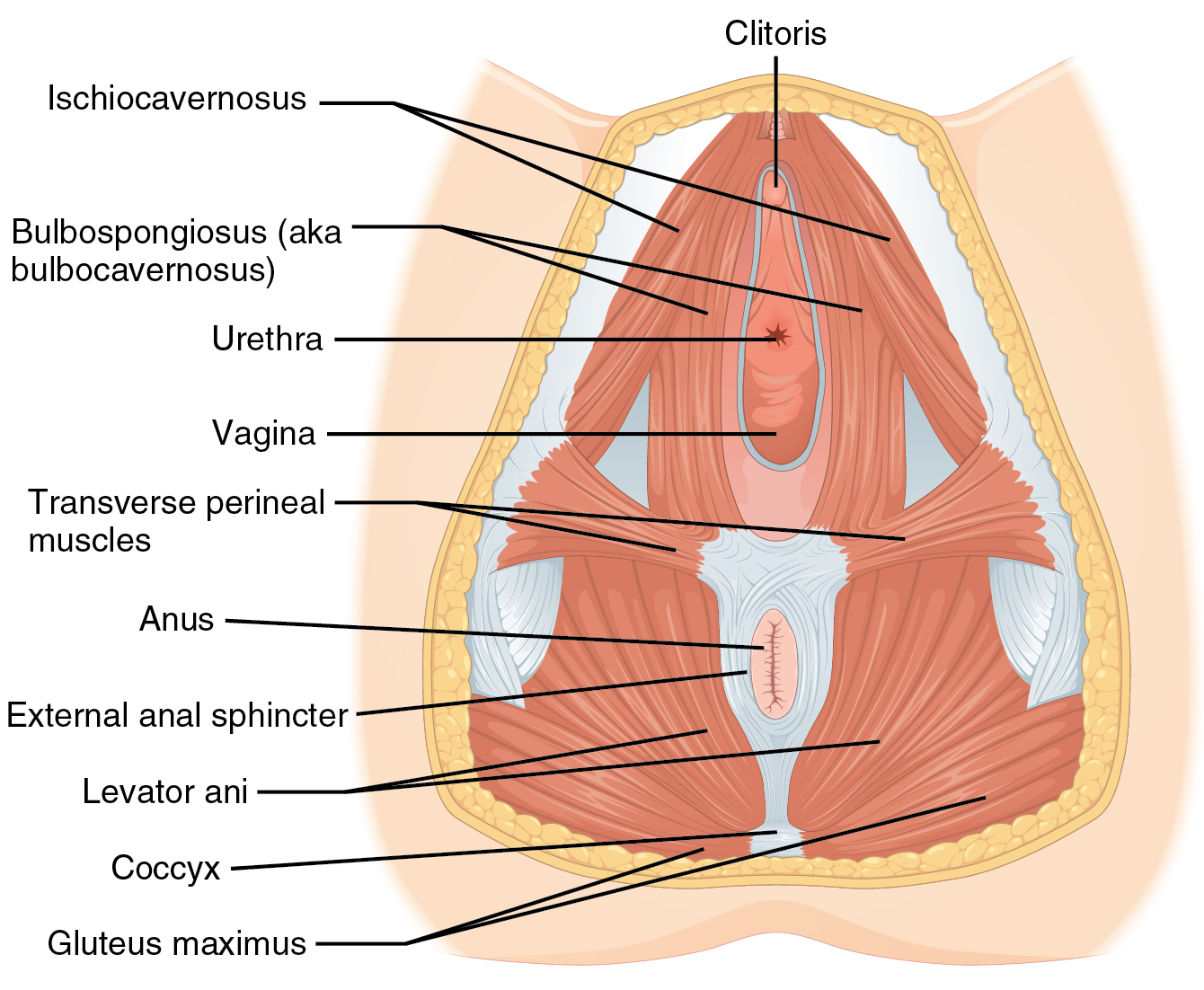
Perineoplasty: The internal, muscular anatomy of the female perineum.

A perineoplasty procedure repairs damage to the perineum and damage to the vulva that a woman might experience as a result of:

- Child birth — the stretching of parturition can cause tears to the tissues, or might require cutting (episiotomy) should the woman's birth canal prove too narrow to allow unobstructed passage of the infant. Moreover, any perineal tissue that presents either a cut or a tear can heal and fuse together before the stitches dissolve, regardless of whether or not the tissues originally were joined in that anatomic configuration.
- Obesity — excess weight can over-stretch and damage the structures of the perineum, and can also stress and cause the separation of the perineal muscles.
- Inadequate innervation — either an absence of nerves or too few nerves.

Indications

Clinically, the woman reports a feeling of physical looseness in her vulvo-vaginal area, which might be associated with decreased sexual satisfaction when compared to the degree of her sexual satisfaction before the incidence of the perineal damage. The indications can include detachment of the anal sphincter muscle, and the collapse of her rectum (rectocele). Perineoplasty is occasionally associated with posterior colporrhaphy, and can be performed in conjunction with the procedure.

A perineoplasty procedure first involves a V-shaped incision to the posterior wall of the vagina. Incisions atop the V-incision can be flat, curved, or angled upwards, which incision is applied is determined by the degree of vaginal tightening to be achieved. Once the incision is made, any existing scar tissue and abnormal tissue fixations that resulted from previous injury or surgery or injury are removed. Depending upon the degree of damage occurred to the perineum, the corrections can include the:

- Pubococcygeus muscles
- Bulbospongiosus muscles
- Other muscles detached from their perineal attachments

Stitching of the muscles is carefully performed to avoid creating transverse ridges, and so produce a ridged interior surface in the vagina.

== Dyspareunia ==
A person who experiences painful sexual intercourse (dyspareunia), or who is afflicted with vaginismus (involuntary contraction of the puboccygeus muscles) can be treated with a variant perineoplasty procedure that loosens the over-tight vaginal introitus (entry). Some surgeons use a simple surface incision at the fourchette for such loosening, but generally is not the most effectively corrective surgical approach.

To perform loosening perineoplasty, a triangle of skin is excised from below the vulvar vestibule with its base near the vestibule and its apex near the anus. This allows the removal of genital warts and the adjustment of musculature necessary to increase the size of the vagina. In this procedure, it is desirable to maintain the vaginal mucosa as much as possible. Recovery typically requires 4–6 weeks.

Perineoplasty is generally considered effective for treatment of dyspareunia, including that caused by lichen sclerosus, and vaginismus. It is also considered an effective treatment for vulvar vestibulitis, although it is generally recommended following the failure of nonsurgical methods.

== Criticism ==
- The American College of Obstetricians and Gynecologists (ACOG) published Committee Opinion No. 378: Vaginal “Rejuvenation” and Cosmetic Vaginal Procedures (2007), the college's formal policy statement of opposition to the commercial misrepresentations of labiaplasty, and associated vaginoplastic procedures, as medically “accepted and routine surgical practices”. The ACOG doubted the medical safety and the therapeutic efficacy of the surgical techniques and procedures for performing vaginoplastic operations such as labiaplasty, vaginal rejuvenation, the designer vagina, revirgination, and Gräfenberg Spot amplification, and recommended that women seeking such genitoplastic surgeries must be fully informed, with the available surgical-safety statistics, of the potential health risks of surgical-wound infection, of pudendal nerve damage (resulting in either an insensitive or an over-sensitive vulva), of dyspareunia (painful coitus), of tissue adhesions (epidermoid cysts), and of painful scars.
- To determine whether or not women truly seek labiaplasty solely to have "more socially acceptable genitalia" the International Society for the Study of Women's Sexual Health (ISSWSH) considered the practices of elective plastic surgery of the vulva and of FGC (female genital cutting) in the Third World. The report, Is Elective Vulvar Plastic Surgery ever Warranted and What Screening Should be Done Preoperatively? (2007) indicated that physical variations in the external appearance of the vulvo-vaginal complex are statistically normal, but that labiaplasty – like access to all types of medical treatment – is a woman's human right. Nonetheless, the ISSWSH report concluded that vaginoplastic surgery might be medically warranted only after the woman undergoes a pre-operative psychological screening, and only if the woman afterwards remains so decided – yet also recommended that the vaginal surgery can be performed if the surgeon deems it medically necessary for her health.

== See also ==
- Labiaplasty
- Clitoral hood reduction
- Vaginoplasty
- Vulvo-vaginal health
