= Perineal massage =

Massage of a pregnant woman's perineum prior to childbirth

Antenatal perineal massage (APM) or Birth Canal Widening (BCW) is the massage of a pregnant woman's perineum (the skin and deep tissues around the opening to the vagina) performed in the 4 to 6 weeks before childbirth, i.e., 34 weeks or sooner and continued weekly until birth. The practice aims to gently mimic the 'massaging' action of a baby's head on the opening to the birth canal (vagina) before birth to achieve the 10 cm diameter opening without using the back of baby's head, i.e., doing some of the hard work before the start of labour, making birth less stressful on the baby and mother. The intention is also to attempt to: eliminate the need for an episiotomy during an instrument (forceps and vacuum extraction) delivery; to prevent blood loss (risk of Sheehan's syndrome) and tearing of the perineum during birth, helping to avoid infection (cellulitis and necrotising fasciitis of the pelvic floor muscles) This technique uses plastic surgeons’ tissue expansion principle to aid a natural birth.

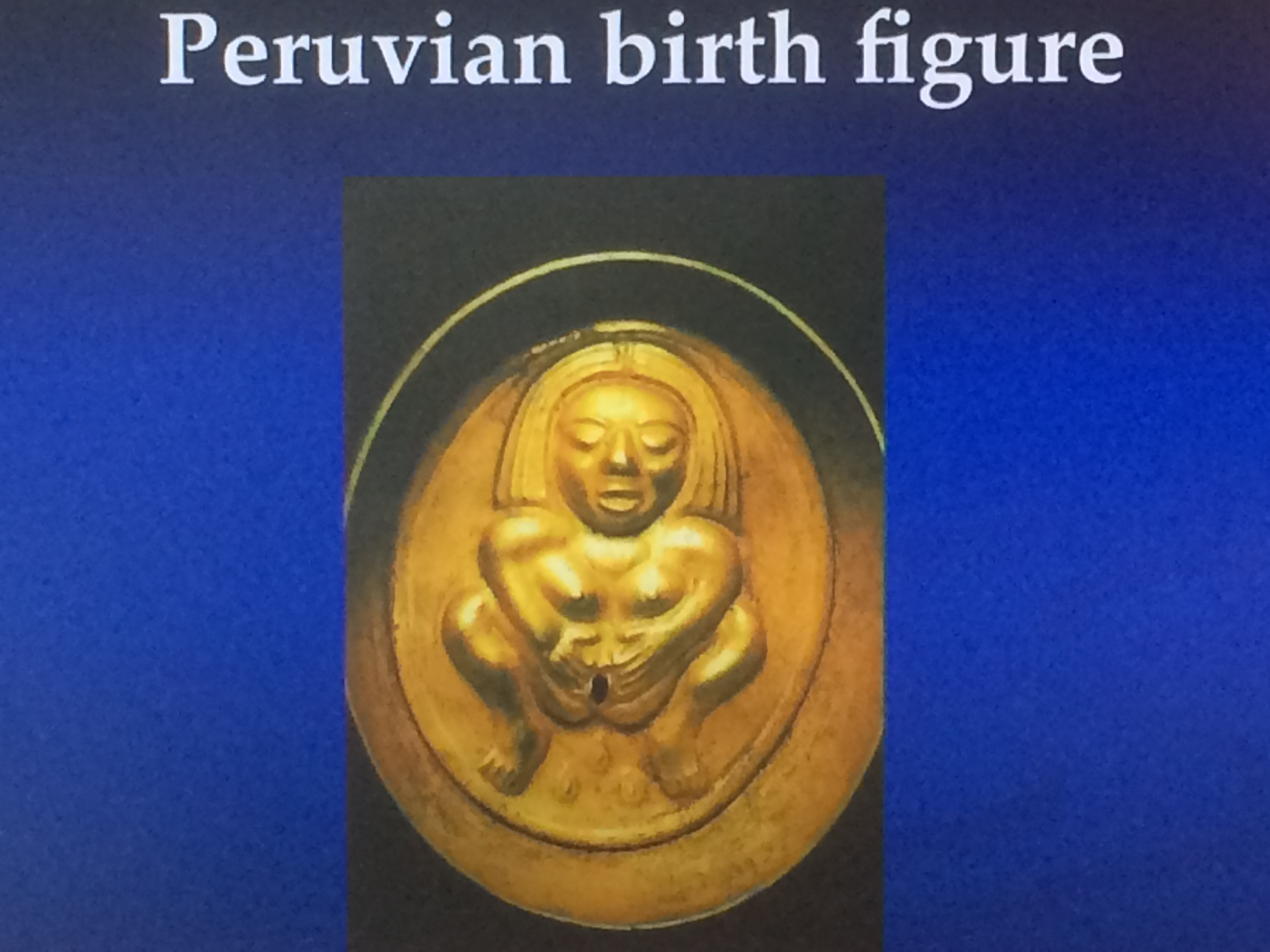
The traditional method of aiding birth by gradual painless stretching over time (skin tissue expansion)

== Description ==
Perineal massage with oil

The Oxford Radcliffe NHS Trust Document "Antenatal Perineal Massage" 2011 describes the use of the pregnant mother's thumbs being placed just inside the birth canal, whilst she stands with one foot supported on the toilet. She pulls backwards towards her spine, whilst relaxing her pelvic floor, progressively increasing the pressure under her finger tips until this starts to feel uncomfortable. On the next occasion she uses both thumbs pulling backwards and then sideways, thumbs away from each other, to enlarge the 2 cm diameter opening of the birth canal progressively over time to 10 cm by progressing to use the four fingers of both hands pulling away from each other, painlessly, to avoid causing tearing. It is not possible to stretch this opening further, because this will be limited by the distance between the bony walls of the pelvis.

If preferred by the mother, a trusted partner can also perform the massage, thus avoiding the need for the mother to be standing up and exerting herself. The mother can sit on a floor or in bed with knees bent and slightly apart, and, after applying oil or lubricant, the partner can perform the massage by inserting initially two fingers, pressing down towards the perineum (in the direction of the anus) as far as the pressure is comfortable for the mother. Once this point of maximum pressure is found, hold the position for 30 seconds. Repeat daily, gradually inserting more fingers until able to insert the 4 fingers of both hands, i.e., you have stretched to 10 cm.

== Purposes ==
The goal of APM is twofold: to prevent the baby's head from undergoing excessive strain during the last 30 minutes of labour by training the mother to relax her pelvic floor in order to allow the baby's head to pass through the opening; and to reduce postpartum blood loss (as hemorrhage in childbirth is one of the leading causes of maternal deaths) due to perineal tearing and episiotomy, which are associated with increased risk of urinary and fecal incontinence, sexual dysfunction, pelvic organ prolapse, and pelvic floor dysfunction. APM helps to stretch the two fibrous layers within the urogenital membrane and the fibrous coats of the pelvic floor muscles, and by transforming the rigid skin at the opening of the vagina into stretchy, elastic skin, decreasing the risk of tearing and shortening the second stage of labor.

== History ==
Antenatal perineal massage or pre-birth obstetric massage (birth canal widening) was reportedly used by African tribal people. The German obstetrician Welheim Horkel, when visiting a medical mission in the mid-1980s, learned that African tribes used gourds of increasing sizes to stretch the perineum, to avoid tearing during childbirth. He replicated this in a hospital setting using an inflatable silicone balloon naming the device 'Epi-no Delphine Plus’. In the Czech Republic, an improvement on the 'Epi-no Delphine Plus' has been produced, the device being named 'Aniball'. A new perineal massage device, Perimom Perineal Massager, was approved for use in the US and in Europe in late 2021 (FDA-registration and CE approval, respectively).

West Berkshire, England, performed an antenatal massage trial in 1984, and many small trials have been performed worldwide since. Cochrane Collaborate Reports since 2006 have advised that women should be informed that episiotomy is avoidable if they employ digital antenatal perineal massage.

== Effectiveness ==
A recent meta-analysis involving 11 randomized clinical trials and more than 3,000 patients in total clearly demonstrated that antenatal perineal massage is associated with a lower risk of severe perineal trauma and postpartum complications. Women who received antenatal perineal massage had significantly lower incidence of episiotomies (RR = 0.79, 95% CI [0.72, 0.87], p < 0.001) and perineal tears (RR = 0.79, 95% CI [0.67, 0.94], p = 0.007), particularly the risk of third- and fourth-degree perineal tears (p = 0.03). Better wound healing and less perineal pain were evident in the antenatal perineal massage group. Antenatal perineal massage reduced the second stage of labor duration (p = 0.005) and anal incontinence (p = 0.003) with significant improvement in baby's Apgar scores at 1 and 5 minutes (p = 0.01 and p = 0.02). Perineal massage by minimising blood loss during birth, decreases the risk of Sheehan's syndrome - the stroke of 'the hormone control centre' on the under surface of the brain, called the pituitary. PubMed.gov 'Sheehan's in modern times: a nationwide retrospective study Iceland 2011'.

Finger tip 'Antenatal Perineal Massage' or 'Birth Canal Widening' to 10 cm diameter, affords mothers worldwide, irrespective of income, the opportunity to shorten the critical last 30 minutes of labour and improve APGAR score of baby at birth. Mothers with a narrowed opening in their bony pelvis, whether from being born with an abnormally narrow pelvis, from previous fracture or from deformity secondary to infection in the bone (osteomyelitis) or very large baby because of gestational diabetes during the pregnancy, or with conjoint twins, may need surgical intervention, as indicated by a failure to progress either when the baby's head fails to enter the bony pelvis or develops fetal distress.

== See also ==
- Kegel exercises
- Birthing chair
- Sheehan's syndrome
