= Superstition in Turkey =

Overview of superstitious beliefs and practices in the Republic of Turkey

Turkey is a country full of many traditions, its superstitions not being far behind. The superstitions are believed to be based on myths, legends, fables, traditions, and stories. The exact origins remain unknown, as most of it was passed down orally through folk-tales.

In Turkish culture, superstitions exist for numerous reasons. They are a form of grounding fear and discipline. Superstitions also are believed in so that people may have a reason to feel protected. Like many beliefs, they are also put into place to explain a higher power and are believed to increase one's favor.

== List ==
=== Black cat ===
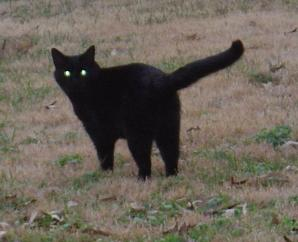
Black cat

If people in Turkey see a black cat, they immediately need to hold something black. Otherwise it's thought to bring bad luck.

=== Broken mirror ===
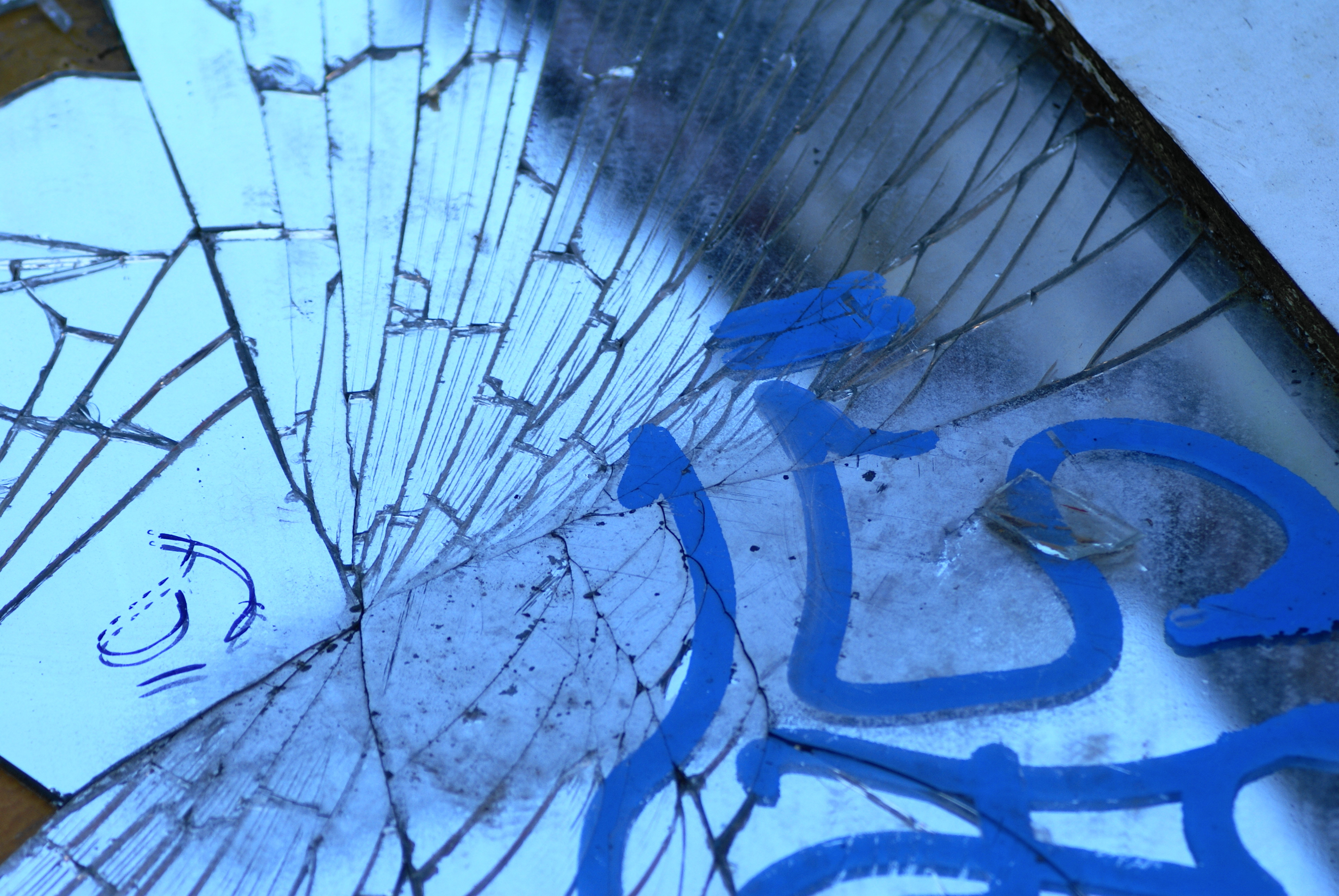
Broken mirror

Like in other cultures, there is a belief that breaking a mirror brings bad luck and seven years of unhappiness.

=== Chewing gum ===
According to Turkish legend, gum should not be chewed at night because it is believed that the person is chewing the flesh of the dead. According to the legend, gum chewed after dark transforms into the flesh of dead people.

=== Evil eye ===
The amulet called nazar is supposed to protect against the "evil eye", a superstition shared among several cultures. The energy is believed to arrive from any positive or negative energy directed towards someone. The effects can go as far are certain symptoms of illnesses, any sort of negative conflict, and even going to the extent of dying. As a form of preventing these affects, it is believed that wearing the evil eye will grant protection to the wearer.

=== Knocking on wood ===
"Knocking on wood" is thought to ward off all evil energies. The ritual is completed when a person is talking about something positive that has happened in their life. The ritual is to pinch your right ear lobe and knock on wood twice, while saying mashallah. It is believed that this stops Satan from becoming aware of your good fortune.

=== Lead pouring ===
There is an old tradition of molybdomancy called "kurşun dökme" in Turkish (literally, "lead casting", "lead pouring") which is supposed to help with various spiritual problems, e.g. to combat the effects of the evil eye or to predict future. The rituals vary, but they involve pouring molten lead into water. This tradition is known in other cultures around the world. Researchers from Ankara University performed a study of the effects of this tradition on the health of women. They reported risks of antimony poisoning and lead poisoning.

=== Repeating statement ===
Turkish people believe that repeating something forty times can make the desired event happen.

=== Right hand and left hand ===
People in Turkey also believe that itching of the right hand means unexpected money inflow in the close future. Likewise, itching of the left hand means a possible loss of money.

=== Slippers ===
Inside a house, if slippers are upside down, it means that somebody will die at home.

=== Owl ===
Regional folk-belief records from Türkiye associate an owl calling on or near a house with misfortune or death. In records from Giresun, an owl calling close to a house was interpreted as a sign that someone in the household would soon die. Similar beliefs have been documented in Aydın and Kütahya, where an owl calling from or above a house was regarded as an omen of death or another serious misfortune. These records represent regional folk traditions rather than a belief necessarily shared throughout Türkiye.

== See also ==
- Superstitions in Muslim societies
