= Perineum sunning =

Wellness practice

Perineum sunning or butthole sunning is a wellness practice that involves exposing the perineum (the area between the genitals and anus) to sunlight. Adherents claim various health benefits such as improved libido, circulation, sleep, and longevity. There is no scientific evidence that this behavior promotes any of the alleged benefits. The practice of exposing a sensitive area of skin to sunlight also increases the risk of skin cancers. Safer alternatives such as mindfulness practices can achieve similar benefits.

== Popularisation ==
On 21 October 2019, an Instagram user "MetaphysicalMeagan" posted about benefits of a purportedly "ancient Taoist practice" of perineum sunning, claiming benefits such as hormone regulation, libido strengthening, and enhancements to "personal magnetism" and the "auric field". The post became a viral phenomenon within a day, particularly after a Twitter user reposted it. Although the perineum is considered a vital body part in Taoism, there is no evidence that perineum sunning is a part of Taoist belief.

Earlier internet references appear from a Facebook meme page, Hold Space For My Tribe, where a post from 1 October 2018 depicts the practice in a satirical manner, with the tagline "Do not abandon your Anus in the Dark".

An analysis of internet search trends in JMIR Dermatology concluded:

Our findings suggest that it took only 24 hours for a potentially dangerous "health" trend to capture the spotlight of mainstream media outlets—an alarming exposé in the power of social media concerning perineum sunning. Additionally, continued observance of the search interest in perineum sunning showed a resurgence during the summer months. Exposure to sunlight is dangerous, and sensitive areas such as the perineum have worse prognosis even when detected during skin examinations.

On 29 November 2019, actor Josh Brolin posted a strong warning against the practice on Instagram, writing "My pucker hole is crazy burned and I was going to spend the day shopping with my family and instead I'm icing and using aloe and burn creams because of the severity of the pain."

A resurgence of viral interest on TikTok in perineum sunning occurred in 2022, with a proliferation of influencers and videos claiming unsubstantiated health benefits.

== Medical response ==
A 2023 peer-reviewed analysis published in the Journal of Medical Internet Research found no clinical evidence supporting the health claims made by proponents of perineum sunning, such as improved energy or hormonal regulation. The authors noted a surge in online interest following media coverage and emphasized the potential dangers of UV exposure to sensitive skin areas. They concluded that while public engagement was high, the practice was "non–evidence-based" and posed "significant dermatologic risk."

Board-certified dermatologists cited in mainstream media share these concerns, stating that there is "no evidence to suggest that sunning the perineum has any effect on physical well-being", saying further that vitamin D synthesis can occur with safer, more conventional sun exposure, such as on the arms and face. They describe the viral popularity of perineum sunning as an example of "social media misinformation" and warn that individuals attempting the practice could be at risk of sunburn and long-term skin damage.

The perineal area is also particularly vulnerable to sun damage. The skin in this region is thinner and typically not acclimated to UV exposure, which may increase the risk of photodamage or skin cancers. Dermatologists warn of the potential for sunburn, hyperpigmentation, and elevated cancer risk when exposing such areas to direct sunlight without protection; risks include melanoma, squamous cell carcinoma, and basal-cell carcinoma.

Doctors recommend safer alternative options such as relaxation, meditation, and mindfulness, which have proven to be beneficial.
