= Episiotomy =

Surgical incision of the perineum and the posterior vaginal wall

- Medio-lateral episiotomy as baby crowns
- Pronunciation: /əˌpiːziˈɒtəmi, ˌɛpəsaɪˈ-/
- Other names: Perineotomy
- Specialty: Obstetrics
- ICD-9-CM: 73.6
- MeSH: D004841
- MedlinePlus: 002920

Episiotomy, also known as perineotomy, is a surgical incision of the perineum and the posterior vaginal wall generally done by an obstetrician. This is usually performed during the second stage of labor to quickly enlarge the aperture, allowing the baby to pass through. The incision, which can be done from the posterior midline of the vulva straight toward the anus or at an angle to the right or left (medio-lateral episiotomy), is performed under local anesthetic (pudendal anesthesia), and is sutured after delivery.

Its routine use is no longer recommended, as perineal massage applied to the vaginal opening is an alternative to enlarge the orifice for the baby. It was once one of the most common surgical procedures specific to women. In the United States, as of 2012, it was performed in 12% of vaginal births. It is also widely practiced in many other parts of the world, including Korea, Japan, Taiwan, China, and Spain in the early 2000s.

== Uses ==
Vaginal tears can occur during childbirth, most often at the introitus as the baby's head passes through, especially if the baby descends quickly. Episiotomies are used to prevent soft-tissue tearing (perineal tear) which may involve the anal sphincter and rectum. Tears can involve the perineal skin or extend to the muscles and the anal sphincter and anus. The midwife or obstetrician may decide to make a surgical cut to the perineum with scissors or a scalpel to make the baby's birth easier and prevent severe injuries that can be difficult to repair. The cut is repaired with stitches (sutures). Some childbirth facilities have a policy of routine episiotomy.

Specific reasons to do an episiotomy are unclear. Though indications on the need for episiotomy vary and may even be controversial (see discussion below), where the technique is applied, there are two main variations. Both are depicted in the above image.

- In one variation, the midline episiotomy, the line of incision is central over the anus. This technique bifurcates the perineal body, which is essential for the integrity of the pelvic floor. Precipitous birth can also sever—and more severely sever—the perineal body, leading to long-term complications such as incontinence. Therefore, the oblique technique is often applied (also pictured above).
- In the oblique technique, the perineal body is avoided, cutting only the vagina epithelium, skin, and muscles (transversalius and bulbospongiosus). This technique aids in avoiding trauma to the perineal body by either surgical or traumatic means.

In 2009, a Cochrane meta-analysis based on studies with over 5,000 women concluded that: "Restrictive episiotomy policies appear to have a number of benefits compared to policies based on routine episiotomy. There is less posterior perineal trauma, less suturing and fewer complications, no difference for most pain measures and severe vaginal or perineal trauma, but there was an increased risk of anterior perineal trauma with restrictive episiotomy". The authors were unable to find quality studies that compared mediolateral versus midline episiotomy.

== Types ==
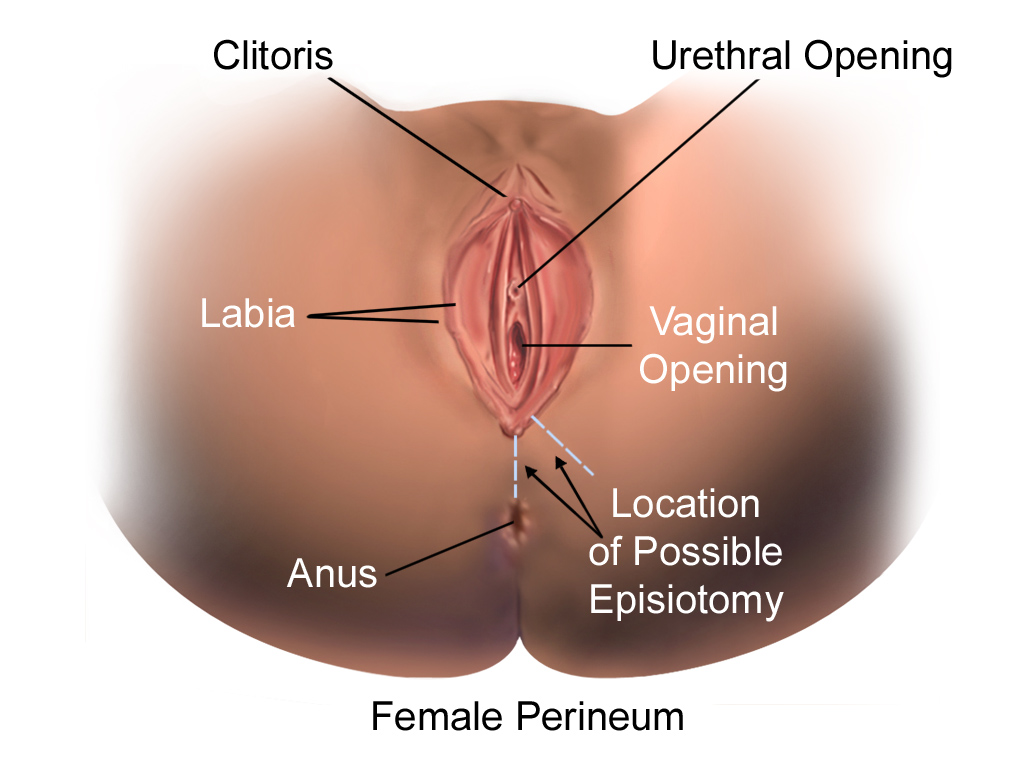
Illustration of midline and medio-lateral incision sites for possible episiotomy

Illustration of infant crowning and midline and medio-lateral incision sites for possible episiotomy during delivery

There are four main types of episiotomy:

- Medio-lateral: The incision is made downward and outward from the midpoint of the fourchette either to the right or left. It is directed diagonally in a straight line which runs about 2.5 cm (1 in) away from the anus (midpoint between the anus and the ischial tuberosity).
- Median: The incision commences from the centre of the fourchette and extends on the posterior side along the midline for 2.5 cm (1 in).
- Lateral: The incision starts from about 1 cm (0.4 in) away from the centre of the fourchette and extends laterally. Drawbacks include the chance of injury to the Bartholin's duct; therefore, some practitioners have strongly discouraged lateral incisions.
- J-shaped: The incision begins in the centre of the fourchette and is directed posteriorly along the midline for about 1.5 centimetres (0.59 in) and then directed downwards and outwards along the 5 or 7 o'clock position to avoid the internal and external anal sphincter. This procedure is also not widely practised.

== Controversy ==
Traditionally, physicians have used episiotomies to deflect the cut in the perineal skin away from the anal sphincter muscle, as control over stool (faeces) is an important function of the anal sphincter. This technique is intended to lessen perineal trauma, minimize postpartum pelvic floor dysfunction, reduce the loss of blood during delivery by avoiding damaging the anal sphincter muscle (as this muscle has a good blood supply), and protect against neonatal trauma. While episiotomy is employed to obviate issues such as post-partum pain, incontinence, and sexual dysfunction, some studies suggest that episiotomy surgery itself can cause all of these problems. The episiotomy and wound can continue as a tear and damage the ring of muscle around the lower part of the large bowel, the anal sphincter. Research has shown that natural tears typically are less severe (although this is perhaps surprising since an episiotomy is designed for when natural tearing will cause significant risks or trauma). Slow delivery of the head in between contractions will result in the least perineal damage. Studies in 2010 based on interviews with postpartum women have concluded that limiting perineal trauma during birth is conducive to continued sexual function after birth. At least one study has recommended that routine episiotomy be abandoned for this reason.

In various countries, routine episiotomy has been an accepted medical practice for many years. Since about the 1960s, routine episiotomies have been rapidly losing popularity among obstetricians and midwives in almost all countries in Europe, Australia, Canada, and the United States. A nationwide U.S. population study suggested that 31% of women having babies in U.S. hospitals received episiotomies in 1997, compared with 56% in 1979. In Latin America, it remains popular and is performed in 90% of hospital births.

=== Discussion ===
Having an episiotomy may increase perineal pain during postpartum recovery, resulting in trouble defecating, particularly in midline episiotomies. In addition, it may complicate sexual intercourse by making it painful and replacing erectile tissues in the vulva with scar tissue.

In cases where an episiotomy is indicated, a mediolateral incision may be preferable to a median (midline) incision, as the latter is associated with a higher risk of injury to the anal sphincter and the rectum. Damage to the anal sphincter caused by episiotomy can result in fecal incontinence (loss of control over defecation). Conversely, one of the reasons episiotomy is performed is to prevent tearing of the anal sphincter, which is also associated with fecal incontinence.

=== Impacts on sexual intercourse ===
Some midwives compare routine episiotomy to female genital mutilation. One study found that women who underwent episiotomy reported more painful intercourse and insufficient lubrication 12–18 months after birth but did not find any problems with orgasm or arousal.

== Pain management ==
Perineal pain after episiotomy has immediate and long-term negative effects on women and their babies. These effects can interfere with breastfeeding and the care of the infant. The pain from injection sites and episiotomy is managed by the frequent assessment of the report of pain from the mother. Pain can come from possible lacerations, incisions, uterine contractions, and sore nipples. Appropriate medications are usually administered. Nonpharmacologic interventions can also be used: a warm salt bath increases blood flow to the area, decreases local discomfort, and promotes healing. Routine episiotomies have not been found to reduce the level of pain after the birth.

== See also ==
- Husband stitch
- Perineal massage
- Sheehan's syndrome
