= Müllerian anomalies =

Medical condition

Müllerian duct anomalies are those structural anomalies caused by errors in Müllerian duct development as an embryo forms. Factors contributing to them include genetics and maternal exposure to substances that interfere with fetal development.

Genetic causes of Müllerian duct anomalies are complicated and uncommon. Inheritance patterns can be autosomal dominant, autosomal recessive, and X-linked disorders. Müllerian anomalies can be part of a multiple malformation syndrome. Studies have estimated that Mullerian anomalies can affect between 4 percent and nearly 7 percent of the female population.

Müllerian anomalies occur as a congenital malformation of the Müllerian ducts during embryogenesis. The Müllerian ducts are also referred to as paramesonephric ducts, referring to ducts next to (para) the mesonephric (Wolffian) duct during foetal development. Paramesonephric ducts are paired ducts derived from the embryo, and for females develop into the uterus, uterine tubes, cervix and upper two-thirds of the vagina. Embryogenesis of the Müllerian ducts play important roles in ensuring normal development of the female reproductive tract. However, when defects in each of the three phases of embryogenesis occur, it results in specific structural malformations which are distinguished according to anatomy into seven classes based on the American Society for Reproductive Medicine (ASRM) classification system. Class I and II anomalies result from underdevelopment of the two separate primitive uterine, vaginal and cervical pockets due to an arrest of stage one of organogenesis, resulting in underdevelopment of both left and right primitive uterus (class I) or underdevelopment of one of the primitive uterus (class II). Class III and IV anomalies result from failure of midline fusion of the two separate primitive pockets due to an arrest of stage two of organogenesis. Class V and VI anomalies result from failure of degeneration of the midline due to an arrest at stage three of organogenesis. Class VII anomalies are malformations caused by Diethylstilbestrol (DES).

== Vaginal agenesis (Mayer–Rokitansky–Kuster–Hauser syndrome) and class I anomalies ==
Mayer–Rokitansky–Kuster–Hauser (MRKH) syndrome is a class I developmental disorder of the Müllerian ducts where the vagina and uterus are underdeveloped or absent. Females with MRHK syndrome have normal chromosome pattern of 46,XX karyotype, with normal functioning ovaries and secondary sex characteristics. Females with MRKH are unable to carry a pregnancy due to a malformed uterus, but can have children via assisted reproduction. MRKH syndrome type 1 results when only reproductive organs such as vagina are affected (vaginal agenesis) and type 2 results when abnormalities develop in other parts of the body such as abnormal kidney formation (unilateral renal agenesis).

=== Causes ===
MRKH syndrome occurs from an arrest in the embryonic development in the first phase of organogenesis, resulting in underdevelopment of one or both the left and right primitive uterus and vagina (agenesis). Specifically, an arrest in the development of the paramesonephric ducts at week seven of gestation is linked to MRKH syndrome. During embryological development of the first phase, two separate uterine, cervical and vaginal pockets develop, following which a transverse septum forms across the caudal aspect in the upper two thirds of the vagina, which will dissolve when the lower one third of the vagina (developed from the urogenital sinus) fuses with the upper two thirds. An arrest at this stage means midline fusion of pockets do not occur and subsequently are unable to develop into a whole uterus, cervix and vagina.

Changes in the sequences of DNA bases due to mutations in WNT3, HNF1b and LHX1 are decreased in people with MRKH. Mice with mutant alleles for Wnt4, Wnt5a, Wnt7a and Wnt9b display varying extents of Müllerian duct hypoplasia indicating these genes may cause MRKH-like phenotypes in humans. A commonly identified copy number variants (CNVs) deletion of 17q12 is present in both type 1 and type 2 MRKH patients. The deletion of 17q12 results in a loss of 2 specific genes, HNFB and LHX1 at position q12 on chromosome 17 which are linked to Müllerian anomalies. Most 17q12 deletions result from genetic mutations in people with no known history of MRHK syndrome in their family.

== Clinical presentations and diagnosis ==
Patients who have not reached puberty are asymptomatic and diagnosis is difficult at this stage as the vagina and uterus are not fully developed. Estrogenization during puberty will increase the size of the uterus and allow for accurate evaluation. Symptomatic patients will present with pain at the uterus area due to infections or abnormal vaginal bleeding with cyclical pelvic pain.

=== Clinical presentations of septate uterus ===
Diagnosis of septate uterus is based on ultrasound findings of two endometrial cavities and a smooth contouring of the fundus. The septum separating both endometrial cavities is thin and may descend into the cervix and the vagina. An over extended septum can cause the cervix to be obstructed, allowing pathogens to infect the region resulting in pelvic pain due to inflammation of the cervix. The Müllerian duct can be partially obstructed or fully obstructed. In the case where the Müllerian duct is partially obstructed, a reduced cervix opening obstructs menstrual bleeding flow, causing prolonged menstrual bleeding (hypermenorrhea). When there is complete obstruction, patients will present with absence of menstruation (amenorrhea). For patients where the septum extends longitudinally, bleeding will persist when a tampon is used as there are two vaginal openings, and dyspareunia (pain during intercourse) is common.

Magnetic resonance imaging (MRI) is useful in detecting obstruction of the endometrium due to hematometra, which appears as cavitated uterine buds on images, and are unable to be detected by ultrasound. MRI provides three-dimensional information of both internal and external contours and can differentiate septate from bicornuate uterus and other complex anomalies.

=== Development defects in other tissues ===
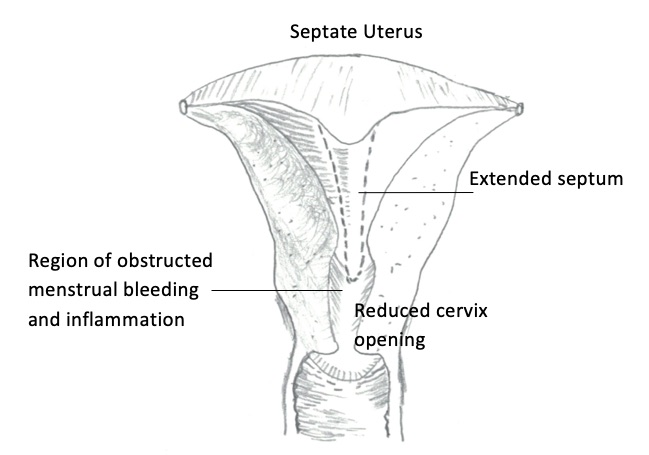
Illustration of a cross section of a septate uterus in homo sapiens (modern day humans) reflecting an anomalous extension of the septum, resulting in inflammation and hypomenorrhea due to reduction of the cervical opening.

Malformation of the Müllerian ducts in foetuses can result in exhibition of extragenital anomalies such as urological anomalies that includes unilateral renal agenesis, horseshoe kidneys or malformation of collecting ducts. Skeletal malformations which include congenital dislocation of the hip, malformations of the arms, foot, ribs, hemivertebrae in the lumbar spine and cervical spina bifida are associated with Müllerian anomalies. Mutations of homeobox genes HOXA10, HOXA11 and HOXA13 in uterus malformations are also responsible for renal and skeletal developmental anomalies. However, the mechanism of action of these genes has not been established.

=== Non-surgical treatment ===
The Frank and Ingram procedure is a common non-operative procedure used to increase function of the vaginal via dilators. The method uses graduated dilators to progressively invaginate the mucosa to dilate the opening, increasing depth and functionality of the vaginal over time. The Ingram modification involves using a bicycle seat positioned between the legs allowing direct contact with the perineum creating pressure on the vagina. Thus, by applying pressure to the mucosa, a neovagina forms. It takes between four months up to several years for complete successful treatment.

=== Surgical treatment ===
The McIndoe procedure uses a split-thickness skin graft from the patient where it is placed over an obturator and sewn at the ends to from a tube with one closed end. A transverse incision at the vaginal dimple and a small cavity is made at the level of the peritoneum by the surgeon. The skin graft and obturator are inserted into the vagina vault and secured to the labia minora. Synthetic skin grafts are also an alternative, eliminating the need for skin grafts from patients. The use of dilators post operation for three to six months is required to prevent contraction of the vagina. Complications include skin graft failure due to the formation of a hematoma beneath the graft, postoperative hematoma that prevents the graft from receiving adequate nourishment, rectal perforation and fistula formation. Patients with prior history of vaginal or perineal surgery have higher complication rates.

The Sigmoid vaginaplasty procedure uses a segment of the patient's sigmoid colon where one end is pulled down to form a neovagina while the other end is sealed forming a blind pouch. Complications include narrowing of the vaginal (stenosis) and weakening of pelvic floor muscles and ligaments which are unable to support the uterus (uterine prolapse). As the use of dilators are not required for sigmoid vaginoplasty, this treatment is favoured over the McIndoe procedure.

== Diethylstilbestrol and class VII anomalies ==
Diethylstilbestrol (DES) was a synthetic oestrogen supplement introduced in 1938 to decrease miscarriage in the first trimester by enhancing the oestrogen dependent follicular phase and implantation of blastocysts. DES is a known teratogen, by crossing the placenta DES disrupts organogenesis by disorganising uterine muscle layers causing maldevelopment of uterus and uterine tube junctions. This prevents normal columnar ciliated cell formation of the vaginal epithelium and reabsorption of vaginal glands. When absorbed, DES is broken down to produce a transient quinone-like reactive intermediate that alters normal gene function of HOX and WNT, affecting differentiation of Müllerian ducts. In utero DES exposure has additionally been linked to epigenetic changes responsible for uterine anomalies such as dysregulation of the homeobox gene HOXA10 by hypermethylation of HOXA10, altering long term expression of genes which controls uterine organogenesis.

DES is also an endocrine disrupting compound (EDC) which alters normal hormone responses required for reproductive tract development in foetuses. A dose–response association for DES has not been establish but an association with the time of exposure in utero suggest exposure to DES at a certain embryological stage leads to increase susceptibility to Müllerian anomalies.

Female foetuses exposed to DES in utero (DES daughters) have abnormalities in development in three areas of the Müllerian duct, namely of their uterus, cervix and vagina. DES uterine anomalies include hypoplastic uterus (small uterus), T-shaped uterine cavity and constrictions of the endometrial cavity. DES uterine anomalies vary in extent in different races, with foetuses of African American females being more prone to fibroids development during organogenesis. DES cervical and vaginal anomalies include hypoplasia, collar and hood malformation of the vagina and cervix and is seen in 20% of women exposed to DES.

== Epidemiology ==
The prevalence of vaginal agenesis or class I uterine anomalies is 1:5000 female live births globally. The most prevalent form of vaginal agenesis is Mayer–Rokitansky–Kuster–Hauser (MRKH) syndrome and results in congenital aplasia or hypoplasia of Müllerian derived structures. MRKH syndrome account for 5% to 10% of all Müllerian anomalies. While septate uterus or class II uterine anomalies account for 3% to 7% of all Müllerian anomalies. The prevalence of Müllerian anomalies also differs within the female population, occurring in 5.5% of the general population, 8% in sterile females and 13.3% in females with a history of miscarriage.

== Pathogenesis ==
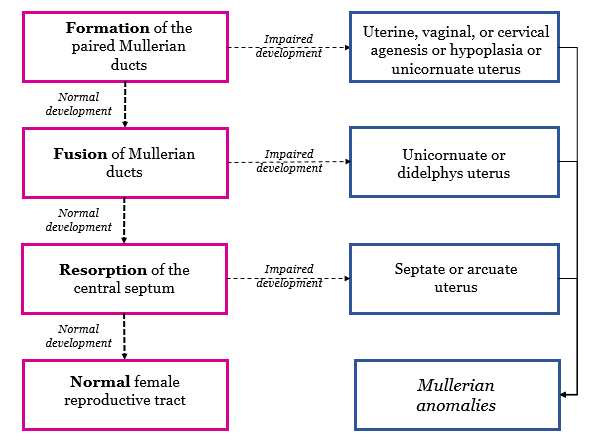
The stages of Müllerian duct development in the human embryo and its associated outcomes during normal and impaired development.

The human female reproductive system consists of the gonads, external genitalia and the Müllerian duct system. Initially in the embryo, both the Wolffian (mesonephric) and Müllerian (paramesonephric) ducts are present, where development of the Wolffian ducts give rise to the male reproductive tract and development of the Müllerian ducts give rise to the female reproductive tract. These ducts are identical until approximately week 6 of embryonic development. In males, the sex-determining region Y (SRY) gene on the Y chromosome suppresses Müllerian duct development, by initiating the production of anti-Müllerian hormone by the Sertoli cells of the testicle. The Müllerian ducts only develop in the absence of anti-Müllerian hormone, where the Wolffian ducts regress.

Development of the female reproductive tract begins at approximately week 8 of embryonic development, and development of the Müllerian duct system is typically complete by the end of the first trimester. The Müllerian ducts develop to give rise to the fallopian tubes, uterus, cervix and upper two-thirds of the vagina. The ovaries are not part of the Müllerian system and arise from primordial germ cells, which develop at the genital ridge.

The formation of the female reproductive tract via the Müllerian ducts has 3 distinct stages. An array of Müllerian anomalies can occur if any of these processes are arrested or impaired.

The first stage of Müllerian duct development is organogenesis, where both Müllerian ducts are formed. If the formation of the Müllerian ducts is impaired or does not occur, this can give rise to uterine, cervical and/or vaginal hypoplasia or agenesis. Müllerian agenesis, also known as the Mayer–Rokitansky–Kuster–Hauser (MRKH) syndrome, results in the congenital absence of the vagina or uterus. Women with MRKH syndrome commonly present with primary amenorrhea, where menstruation does not occur by the age of 16. In the first stage of development, it is also possible for only one Müllerian duct to develop, giving rise to a single uterine horn (unicornuate uterus). Unicornuate uteri commonly develop on the right side, although the reason for this preference remains elusive.

The second stage of Müllerian duct development involves the fusion of the inferior portion of the ducts to form the uterus, cervix and upper two-thirds of the vagina. The superior part of the Müllerian ducts do not fuse and form the left and right fallopian tubes. Disruptions to this stage of development can result in didelphys or bicornuate uteri anomalies. In both didelphys and bicornuate uteri, the non-fusion of the Müllerian ducts results in two distinct uterine cavities.

The third and final stage of Müllerian duct development is septal resorption. After the lower Müllerian ducts fuse, a central septum is left behind, and this partition must be eliminated to give rise to a single uterine cavity, cervical canal and vaginal canal. Defects in septal resorption may produce a septate uterus or arcuate uterus, where the septum divides the uterine cavity. More than 50% of women with reported Müllerian anomalies have septate uteri. It is common for other developmental defects to occur in conjunction with Müllerian anomalies, including renal, skeletal, auditory and cardiac abnormalities.

== Causes ==
The causes of Müllerian anomalies are not well-understood. The aetiology of this congenital disease may be multifactorial, with genetics, socioeconomic factors and geographic factors playing a role in dysfunctional Müllerian duct development. Müllerian anomalies likely occur early in development, as the congenital disorder often occurs in association with renal and anorectal disorders.

Typically, women with Müllerian abnormalities have a normal female karyotype (46, XX). Most incidences of Müllerian anomalies occur sporadically, with instances of familial inheritance patterns being less common. The genetic component of the disease classically follows an autosomal dominant pattern, with variable rates of genotypic expression.

=== WNT4 signalling ===
WNT4 is a gene that has a crucial role in embryonic development, particularly to ensure the normal formation of the female reproductive system, the kidneys and several endocrine organs. The Wnt4 gene pathway promotes female sexual differentiation, while suppressing male sexual differentiation. Mice lacking Wnt4 display androgenisation, the presence of Wolffian ducts and absence of Müllerian ducts. This effect is mirrored in humans, where mutations in the WNT4 gene has been observed in MRKH syndrome patients, who display hyperandrogenism. Mutations in WNT4 gene are not always present in individuals with Müllerian anomalies or MRKH syndrome, but the WNT4 gene is the only gene that has been clearly implicated in MRKH.

=== TP63 ===
TP63 is a tumour protein encoded by the EMX2 gene, which is expressed in uterine and vaginal epithelium. The TP63 protein is required for epithelial differentiation during Müllerian duct development in utero, by promoting the transcription of particular genes. EMX2 mutations result in incomplete Müllerian fusion. Some women with unicornuate uteri exhibit mutant EMX2 and significantly decreased expression of TP63, implicating TP63 in the fusion stage of Müllerian development.

=== Diethylstilbestrol (DES) ===
DES is a synthetic non-steroidal estrogen that was used during 1940–1971, to prevent premature births, miscarriage and other pregnancy complications. The use of DES was discontinued after it was established that approximately 69% of females who were exposed to DES in utero had uterine abnormalities. DES has been marked as a teratogen as it results in malformation of the embryo. DES is more potent than steroidal estrogen and binds to cytosolic receptors after crossing the placenta. DES is not metabolised as quickly as endogenous estrogen. DES remains bound to cytosolic receptors for a longer period of time. The extended binding time of DES and the subsequent prolonged activation of its cognate receptors has been suggested to disrupt Müllerian development, resulting in uterine abnormalities. Exposure to DES induced multiple uterine abnormalities including constriction bands, hypoplasticity in the uterine cavity and irregular borders. Females exposed to this teratogen in utero presented most commonly with a T-shaped uterus, resulting in increased rates of ectopic pregnancy, spontaneous abortions, and an overall increased risk of adverse pregnancy outcome.

== Impact on fertility and pregnancy ==
The incidence of individuals with Müllerian anomalies is twice as high in the infertile population than in the fertile population. Women who do experience some obstetric complications usually have trouble maintaining full-term pregnancy, rather than issues with conception. Due to improper development of the uterus and fallopian tubes, pregnancies in women with Müllerian anomalies could result in spontaneous abortions, preterm birth, intrauterine growth restriction, perinatal mortality, placental abruption and other malpresentations.

Advancements in the epidemiology of Müllerian anomalies has resulted in earlier diagnosis and treatment. Uterine obstructions can be surgically repaired or managed to result in successful perinatal outcomes.

Normal ovarian function is not interrupted in females with Müllerian anomalies and women with the anomaly have been able to utilise assisted reproductive technologies and a gestational carrier to increase the chance of successful reproductive outcomes.

=== Maintaining pregnancy ===
Physiological changes that occur in conjunction with Müllerian anomalies explain why some women with the disorder experience difficulties maintaining pregnancy. These physiological changes include compromised blood flow to the uterus, low uterine muscle mass and an insufficient cervix.

An insufficient flow of blood to the uterus would compromise nutritional supply to the foetus and waste removal from the foetus, and this can explain the heightened occurrence of low foetal birth weight (intrauterine growth restriction) and spontaneous abortions in women with Müllerian anomalies. Women with anomalies such as didelphys and bicornuate uteri present with a decreased uterine size and subsequent lower muscle mass. A diminished uterine capacity reduces the likelihood of the foetus reaching full-term development due to spatial constraints, explaining the higher rates of preterm births observed in women with Müllerian anomalies.

The degree to which the Müllerian anomaly impairs the reproductive potential of a woman varies between individuals, and is dependent on the type of anomaly and its severity. Women with minor fusion defects such as arcuate uteri and septate uteri tend to have a lower risk of aversive pregnancy outcome, compared to patients with major fusion defects, such as unicornuate uteri, bicornuate uteri and didelphys uteri. Females with severe agenesis and/or hypoplasia, such as in MRKH syndrome, have an increased chance of poor reproductive outcomes without surgical intervention.

=== Assisted reproductive technologies ===
Women with Müllerian anomalies often utilise assisted reproductive technologies such as in vitro fertilisation (IVF), intracytoplasmic sperm injection (ICSI) and embryo transfer (ET), and/or a gestational carrier. Compared to individuals with no uterine anomalies, women with Müllerian anomalies exhibit no differences in number of follicles produced, number of oocytes retrieved, or levels of estrogen produced. The normal follicular function, oocyte population and estrogen levels in women with Müllerian anomalies occurs as normal ovarian function is not compromised in the disease.

In patients with uterine anomalies, there may be a chance that the endometrial cavity can be compromised, such that implantation following IVF does not always lead to a successful pregnancy. If an individual has a reduced likelihood of effective implantation, a gestational carrier can be appointed to increase the chance of a successful pregnancy.

Women that present with unicornuate uteri may have an increased risk of spontaneous abortions, premature labour and preterm delivery, while individuals with unicornuate uteri may be at risk of ectopic pregnancy. These risks can be minimised if assisted reproductive technologies are utilised.

Correcting the anomaly prior to commencing assisted reproductive technologies can increase the possibility of reproductive success by increasing the chance of implantation and reducing the likelihood of complications occurring after pregnancy occurs. A greater rate of successful pregnancies are observed in women with septate uteri when the septum is operated on prior to implantation of the embryo.

== See also ==
- Mayer–Rokitansky–Küster–Hauser syndrome
- Vaginal agenesis
