= Breech birth =

Birth of a baby bottom first

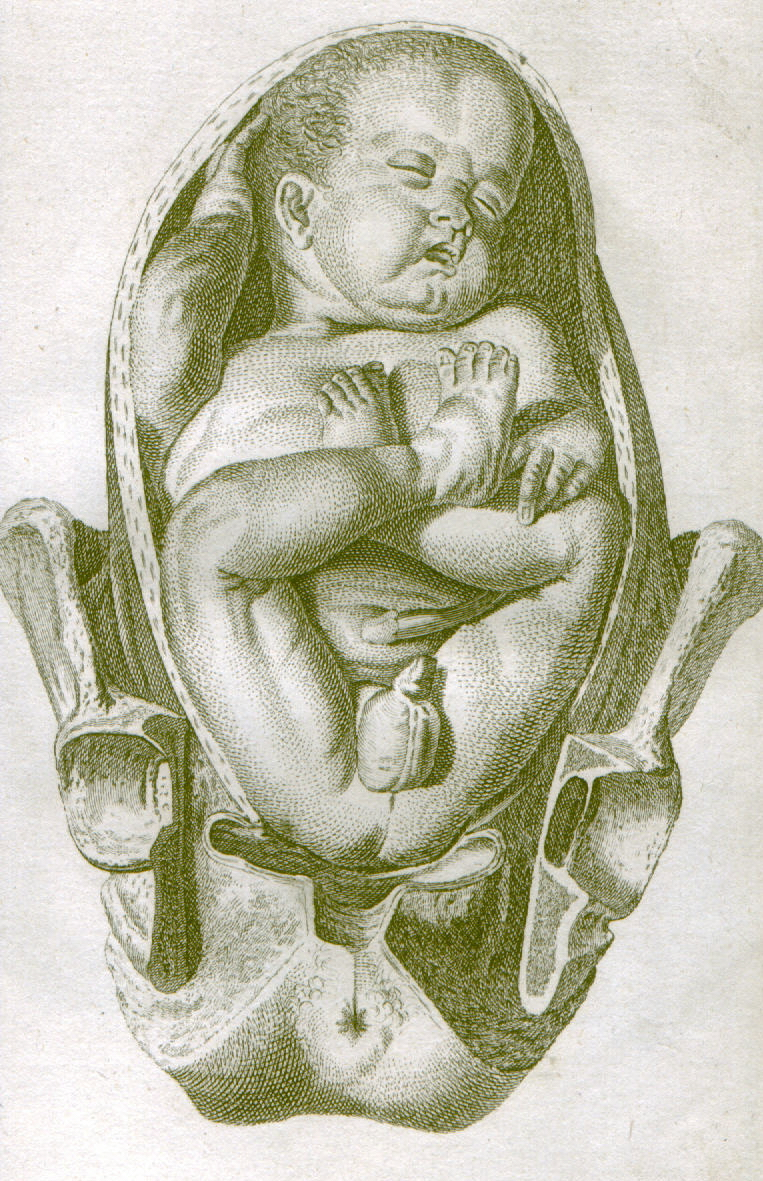
- Drawing of a frank breech from 1754 by William Smellie
- Specialty: Obstetrics, midwifery

A breech birth is the birth of a baby delivered buttocks- or feet-first rather than in the typical head-first orientation. Around 3–4% of pregnant women at full-term (37–40 weeks pregnant) have a breech baby. Due to their higher than average rate of possible complications for the baby, breech births are generally considered higher risk. Breech births also occur in many other mammals such as dogs and horses (see veterinary obstetrics).

Most babies in the breech position are delivered via caesarean section because it is seen as safer than being born vaginally. Doctors and midwives in the developing world often lack the equipment or disposable hospital resources required to safely assist women giving birth to a breech baby vaginally. Also, delivering all breech babies by caesarean section in developing countries is difficult to implement as there are not always resources available to provide this service.

== Cause ==
With regard to the fetal presentation during pregnancy, three periods have been distinguished.

During the first period, which lasts until the 24th gestational week, the incidence of a longitudinal lie increases, with equal proportions of breech or cephalic presentations from this lie. This period is characterized by frequent changes of presentations. The fetuses in breech presentation during this period have the same probability for breech and cephalic presentation at delivery.

During the second period, lasting from the 25th to the 35th gestational week, the incidence of cephalic presentation increases, with a proportional decrease of breech presentation. The second period is characterized by a higher than random probability that the fetal presentation during this period will also be present at the time of delivery. The increase of this probability is gradual and identical for breech and cephalic presentations during this period.

In the third period, from the 36th gestational week onward, the incidence of cephalic and breech presentations remain stable, i.e. breech presentation around 3–4% and cephalic presentation approximately 95%. In the general population, incidence of breech presentation at preterm corresponds to the incidence of breech presentation when birth occurs.

A breech presentation at delivery occurs when the fetus does not turn to a cephalic presentation. This failure to change presentation can result from endogenous and exogenous factors. Endogenous factors involve fetal inability to adequately move, whereas exogenous factors refer to insufficient intrauterine space available for fetal movements.

The incidence of breech presentation is affected by both maternal and fetal diseases and medical conditions. When these factors are present, the probability of breech presentation is between 4% and 50%.

=== Rates in various medical conditions ===
- Fetal entities:
  - First twin 17–30%
  - Second twin 28–39%
  - Stillborn 26%
  - Prader–Willi syndrome 50%, Werdnig–Hoffman syndrome 10%
  - Smith–Lemli–Opitz syndrome 40%
  - Fetal alcohol syndrome 40%
  - Potter anomaly 36%
  - Zellweger syndrome 27%
  - Myotonic dystrophy 21%, 13 trisomy syndrome 12%
  - 18 trisomy syndrome 43%
  - 21 trisomy syndrome 5%
  - de Lange syndrome 10%
  - Anencephalus 6–18%, Spina bifida 20–30%
  - Congenital hydrocephalus 24–37%
  - Osteogenesis imperfecta 33.3%
  - Amyoplasia 33.3%
  - Achondrogenesis 33.3%
  - Amelia 50%
  - Craniosynostosis 8%
  - Sacral agenesis 30.4%
  - Arthrogriposis multiplex congenita 33.3%
  - Congenital dislocation of the hip 33.3%
  - Hereditary sensory neuropathy type III 25%
  - Centronuclear myopathy 16.7%
  - Multiple pituitary hormone deficiency 50%
  - Isolated pituitary hormone deficiency 20%
  - Ectopic posterior pituitary gland 33.3%
  - Congenital bilateral perisilvian syndrome 33.3%
  - Symmetric fetal growth restriction 40%
  - Asymmetric fetal growth restriction 40%
  - Nonimmune hydrops fetalis 15%
  - Atresia ani 18.2%
  - Microcephalus 15.4%
  - Omphalocele 12.5%
  - Prematurity 40%
- Placental and amniotic fluid entities:
  - Amniotic sheet perpendicular to the placenta 50%
  - Cornual–fundal implantation of the placenta 30%
  - Placenta previa 12.5%
  - Oligohydramnios 17%
  - Polyhydramnios 15.8%
- Maternal entities:
  - Uterus arcuatus 22.6%
  - Uterus unicornuatus 33.3%
  - Uterus bicornuatus 34.8%
  - Uterus didelphys 30–41%
  - Uterus septus 45.8%
  - Leiomyoma uteri 9–20%
  - Spinal cord injury 10%
  - Carriers of Duchenne muscular dystrophy 17%
- Combination of two medical entities:
  - First twin in uterus with two bodies 14.29%
  - Second twin in uterus with two bodies 18.52%.

Also, women with previous caesarean deliveries have a risk of breech presentation at term twice that of women with previous vaginal deliveries.

The highest possible probability of breech presentation of 50% indicates that breech presentation is a consequence of random filling of the intrauterine space, with the same probability of breech and cephalic presentation in a longitudinally elongated uterus.

== Types ==
Types of breech depend on how the baby's legs are lying.

- A frank breech (otherwise known as an extended breech) is when the baby's legs are up against its abdomen, with the knees straight and the feet next to the ears. This is the most common type of breech.
- A complete breech (or flexed breech) is when the baby appears as though it is sitting crossed-legged with its legs bent at the hips and knees.
- A footling breech is when one or both of the baby's feet are born first instead of the pelvis. This is more common in babies born prematurely or before their due date.
- A kneeling breech is when the baby is born knees first.

In addition to the above, breech births in which the sacrum is the fetal denominator can be classified by the position of a fetus. Thus sacro-anterior, sacro-transverse and sacro-posterior positions all exist but left sacro-anterior is the most common presentation. Sacro-anterior indicates an easier delivery compared to other forms.

== Complications ==
Umbilical cord prolapse may occur, particularly in the complete, footling, or kneeling breech. This is caused by the lowermost parts of the baby not completely filling the space of the dilated cervix. When the waters break the amniotic sac, it is possible for the umbilical cord to drop down and become compressed. This complication severely diminishes oxygen flow to the baby, so the baby needs to be delivered immediately so that it can breathe. In these circumstances a caesarean section is likely to be recommended. If there is a delay in delivery, the brain can be damaged. Among full-term, head-down babies, cord prolapse is quite rare, occurring in 0.4 percent. Among frank breech babies the incidence is 0.5 percent, among complete breeches 5 percent, and among footling breeches 15 percent.

Head entrapment is caused by the failure of the fetal head to negotiate the maternal midpelvis. At full term, the fetal bitrochanteric diameter (the distance between the outer points of the hips) is about the same as the biparietal diameter (the transverse diameter of the skull)—in simplest terms, the size of the hips is the same as the size of the head. The relatively larger buttocks dilate the cervix as effectively as the head does in the typical head-down presentation. In contrast, the relative head size of a preterm baby is greater than the fetal buttocks. If the baby is preterm, it may be possible for the baby's body to emerge while the cervix has not dilated enough for the head to emerge.

Because the umbilical cord—the baby's oxygen supply—is significantly compressed while the head is in the pelvis during a breech birth, it is important that the delivery of the aftercoming fetal head not be delayed. If the arm is extended alongside the head, delivery will not occur. If this occurs, the Løvset manoeuvre may be employed, or the arm may be manually brought to a position in front of the chest. The Løvset manoeuvre involves rotating the fetal body by holding the fetal pelvis. Twisting the body such that an arm trails behind the shoulder, it will tend to cross down over the face to a position where it can be reached by the obstetrician's finger, and brought to a position below the head. A similar rotation in the opposite direction is made to deliver the other arm. In order to present the smallest diameter (9.5 cm) to the pelvis, the baby's head must be flexed (chin to chest). If the head is in a deflexed position, the risk of entrapment is increased. Uterine contractions and maternal muscle tone encourage the head to flex.

Oxygen deprivation may occur from either cord prolapse or prolonged compression of the cord during birth, as in head entrapment. If oxygen deprivation is prolonged, it may cause permanent neurological damage (for instance, cerebral palsy) or death. It has been suggested that a fast vaginal delivery would mean the risk of stopping baby's oxygen supply is reduced. However, there is not enough research to show this and a quick delivery might cause more harm to the baby than a conservative approach to the birth.

Injury to the brain and skull may occur due to the rapid passage of the baby's head through the mother's pelvis. This causes rapid decompression of the baby's head. In contrast, a baby going through labor in the head-down position usually experiences gradual molding (temporary reshaping of the skull) over the course of a few hours. This sudden compression and decompression in breech birth may cause no problems at all, but it can injure the brain. This injury is more likely in preterm babies. The fetal head may be controlled by a special two-handed grip called the Mauriceau–Smellie–Veit maneuver or the elective application of forceps. This will be of value in controlling the rate of delivery of the head and reducing decompression. Related to potential head trauma, researchers have identified a relationship between breech birth and autism.

Squeezing the baby's abdomen can damage internal organs. Positioning the baby incorrectly while using forceps to deliver the after coming head can damage the spine or spinal cord. It is important for the birth attendant to be knowledgeable, skilled, and experienced with all variations of breech birth.

=== Factors influencing safety ===
- Birth attendant's skill (and experience with breech birth) – The skill of the doctor or midwife and the number of breech births previously assisted is of crucial importance. Many of the dangers in vaginal birth for breech babies come from mistakes made by birth attendants. With the majority of breech babies being delivered by cesarean section, there is more risk that birth attendants will lose their skills in delivering breech babies and therefore increase the risk of harm to the baby during vaginal delivery.
- Type of breech presentation – the frank breech has the most favorable outcomes in a vaginal birth, with many studies suggesting no difference in outcome compared to head-down babies. (Some studies, however, find that planned caesarean sections for all breech babies improve outcome. The difference may rest in part on the skill of the doctors who delivered babies in different studies.) Complete breech presentation is the next most favorable position, but these babies sometimes shift and become footling breeches during labour. Footling and kneeling breeches have a higher risk of cord prolapse and head entrapment.
- Parity – Parity refers to the number of times a woman has given birth before. If a woman has given birth vaginally, her pelvis has "proven" it is big enough to allow a baby of that baby's size to pass through it. However, a head-down baby's head often molds (shifts its shape to fit the maternal pelvis) and so may present a smaller diameter than the same-size baby born breech.
- Fetal size in relation to maternal pelvic size – If the mother's pelvis is roomy and the baby is not large, this is favorable for vaginal breech delivery. However, prenatal estimates of the size of the baby and the size of the pelvis are unreliable.
- Hyperextension of the fetal head – this can be evaluated with ultrasound. Less than 5% of breech babies have their heads in the "star-gazing" position, the face looking straight upwards and the back of the head resting against the back of the neck. Caesarean delivery is absolutely necessary because vaginal birth with the baby's head in this position confers a high risk of spinal cord trauma and death.
- Maturity of the baby – Premature babies appear to be at higher risk of complications if delivered vaginally than if delivered by caesarean section.
- Progress of labor – A spontaneous, normally progressing, straightforward labor requiring no intervention is a favorable sign.
- Second twins – If a first twin is born head down and the second twin is breech, the chances are good that the second twin can have a safe breech birth.

== Management ==
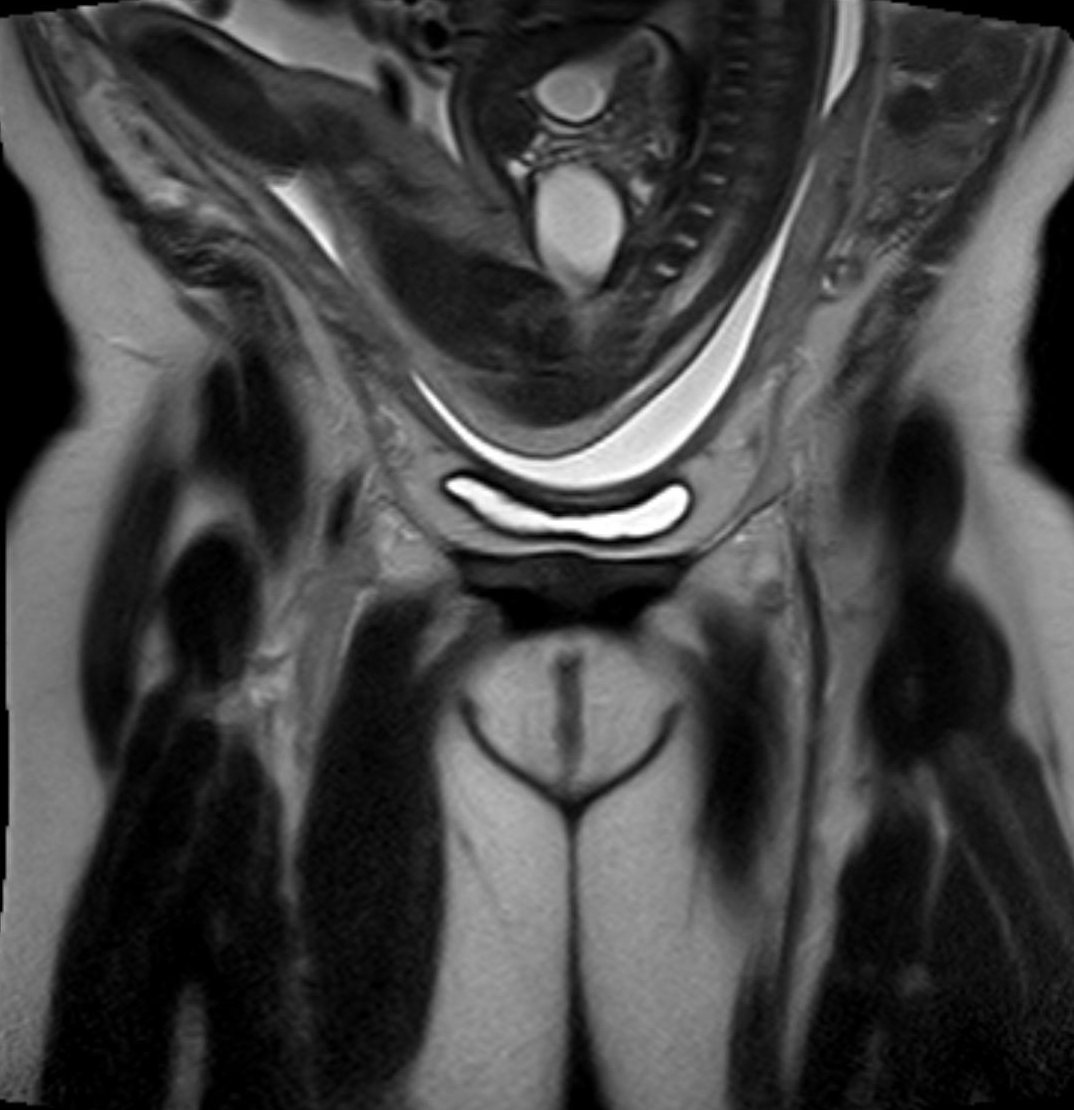
Breech birth position seen on MRI

As in labour with a baby in a normal head-down position, uterine contractions typically occur at regular intervals and gradually the cervix begins to thin and open. In the more common breech presentations, the baby's bottom (rather than feet or knees) is what is first to descend through the maternal pelvis and emerge from the vagina.

At the beginning of labour, the baby is generally in an oblique position, facing either the right or left side. The baby's bottom is the same size in the term baby as the baby's head. Descent is thus as for the presenting fetal head and delay in descent is a cardinal sign of possible problems with the delivery of the head.

In order to begin the birth, a descent of the podalic pole along with compaction and internal rotation needs to occur. This happens when the mother's pelvic floor muscles cause the baby to turn so that it can be born with one hip directly in front of the other. At this point, the baby is facing one of the mother's inner thighs. Then, the shoulders follow the same path as the hips did. At this time the baby usually turns to face the mother's back. Next occurs external rotation, which is when the shoulders emerge as the baby's head enters the maternal pelvis. The combination of maternal muscle tone and uterine contractions causes the baby's head to flex, chin to chest. Then the back of the baby's head emerges and finally the face.

Due to the increased pressure during labour and birth, it is normal for the baby's leading hip to be bruised and genitalia to be swollen. Babies who assumed the frank breech position in utero may continue to hold their legs in this position for some days after birth.

=== Caesarean or vaginal delivery ===
When a baby is born bottom first there is more risk that the birth will not be straightforward and that the baby could be harmed. For example, when the baby's head passes through the mother's pelvis the umbilical cord can be compressed which prevents delivery of oxygenated blood to the baby. Due to this and other risks, babies in breech position are often born by a planned caesarean section in developed countries.

Caesarean section reduces the risk of harm or death for the baby if the baby is in breech position but does increase the risk of harm to the mother compared with a vaginal delivery. It is best if the baby is in a head-down position so that it can be born vaginally with less risk of harm to both mother and baby. The next section is looking at external cephalic version (ECV), which is a method that can help the baby turn from a breech position to a head-down position.

Vaginal birth of a breech baby has its risks but caesarean sections are not always available or possible, a mother might arrive in the hospital at a late stage of her labour or may choose not to have a caesarean section. In these cases, it is important that the clinical skills needed to deliver breech babies are not lost so that mothers and babies are as safe as possible. Compared with developed countries, planned caesarean sections have not produced as good results in developing countries – it is suggested that this is due to more breech vaginal deliveries being performed by experienced, skilled practitioners in these settings.

== Twin breech ==
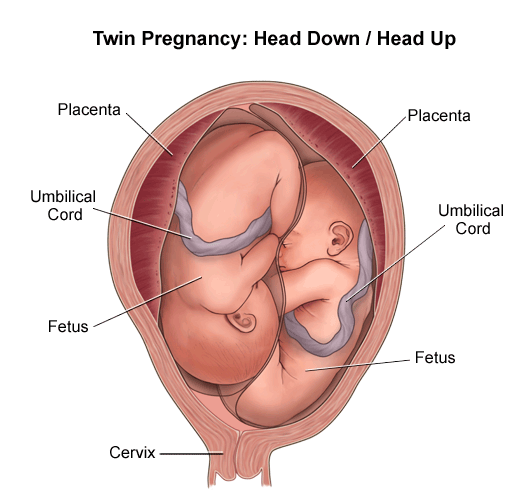
Twin breech (vertex and non-vertex twins)

In twin pregnancies, it is very common for one or both babies to be in the breech position. Most often twin babies do not have the chance to turn around because they are born prematurely. If both babies are in the breech position and the mother has gone into labour early, a cesarean section may be the best option. About 30–40% of twin pregnancies result in only one baby being in the breech position. If this is the case, the babies can be born vaginally. After the first baby who is not in the breech position is delivered, the baby who is presented in the breech position may turn itself around, if this does not happen another procedure may performed called the breech extraction. The breech extraction is the procedure that involves the obstetrician grabbing the second twin's feet and pulling him/her into the birth canal. This will help with delivering the second twin vaginally. However, if the second twin is larger than the first, complications with delivering the second twin vaginally may arise and a cesarean section should be offered. At times, the first twin (the twin closest to the birth canal) can be in the breech position with the second twin being in the cephalic position (vertical). When this occurs, risks of complications are higher than normal. In particular, a serious complication is known as locked twins. This is when both babies interlock their chins during labour. When this happens an urgent cesarean section is recommended.

== Turning the baby ==
Turning the baby, technically known as external cephalic version (ECV), is when the baby is turned by gently pressing the mother's abdomen to push the baby from a bottom first position, to a head first position. In some circumstances, it may be necessary to press with more force. ECV does not always work, but it does improve the mother's chances of giving birth to her baby vaginally and avoiding a cesarean section. The World Health Organisation recommends that women should have a planned cesarean section only if an ECV has been tried and did not work.

Women who have an ECV when they are 36–40 weeks pregnant are more likely to have a vaginal delivery and less likely to have a cesarean section than those who do not have an ECV. Turning the baby before this time makes a head first birth more likely but ECV before the due date can increase the risk of early or premature birth which can cause problems to the baby.

There are treatments that can be used which might affect the success of an ECV. Drugs called beta-stimulant tocolytics help the woman's muscles to relax so that the pressure during the ECV does not have to be so great. Giving the woman these drugs before the ECV improves the chances of her having a vaginal delivery because the baby is more likely to turn and stay head down. Other treatments such as using sound, pain relief drugs such as epidural, increasing the fluid around the baby and increasing the amount of fluids to the woman before the ECV could all affect its success but there is not enough research to make this clear.

== Notable cases ==
- Chesa Boudin
- Jordan Brady
- Becky Garrison
- Billy Joel
- Jerry Lee Lewis
- Bret Michaels
- Nero
- Tatum O'Neal
- David Shields
- Frank Sinatra
- Wilhelm II, German Emperor
- Pedro Zamora
- Frank Zappa

== See also ==
- Asynclitic birth, another abnormal birth position
