= OHVIRA =

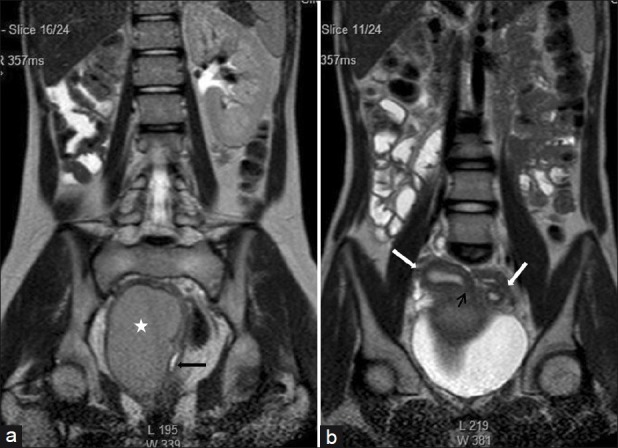
- (a) Coronal Single shot T2W image shows absence of the right kidney. The distended hemivagina (asterisk) is seen on the right side and the normal collapsed left hemivagina with minimal fluid is seen adjacent to it (black arrow). The distended hemivagina ends above the introitus and its contents are hypointense to fat. (b) Coronal Single shot T2W image shows right and left uterine horns (white arrows). The right uterine horn cavity is seen to communicate with the upper end of the fluid collection in right hemivagina (small black arrow).

Herlyn–Werner–Wunderlich syndrome, also known as OHVIRA (obstructed hemivagina and ipsilateral renal anomaly) is an extremely rare syndrome characterized by a congenital birth defect of the lower abdominal and pelvic organs. It is a type of abnormality of the Müllerian ducts.

In most cases, OHVIRA presents as a double uterus–either bicornuate or didelphys– with unilateral obstructed (or blind) hemivagina and ipsilateral renal agenesis (or renal anomalies). It can also affect the urethra, urethral sphincter, ureters, bladder and spleen

Although the true incidence is unknown, it has been reported to be between 0.1% and 3%.

== Development ==
During gestation, the Müllerian ducts fuse laterally with each other and vertically with the urogenital sinus. Incomplete lateral fusion of the upper Müllerian duct segments causes a bicornuate uterus, whereas complete lack of lateral fusion can lead to uterine didelphys (ie, double uterus and cervix).

In addition, failed vertical fusion of the paramesonephric ducts with the urogenital sinus results in a transverse vaginal septum, which can cause primary amenorrhea and cyclic pelvic pain due to menses retained in the uterus.

== Symptoms ==
Although there are no specific symptoms for this condition, common complains include progressively increasing pelvic pain during menstruation and hematocolpos due to the buildup of blood in the body. Other symptoms may include swelling of the abdomen, nausea and vomiting during menstruation, and pelvic pain. Fertility may also be affected.

== Diagnosis ==
The condition is often diagnosed through an MRI or ultrasound. Consulting a specialist (in this case a gynecologist who has an interest in congenital abnormalities) is recommended.

== Treatment ==
Symptoms can be ameliorated with medication and surgery. In most cases, the blind hemi-vagina is opened, and the fluid drained. In adolescents particularly, vaginoscopic incision of the oblique vaginal septum is a viable option.

Pregnancies in women with OHVIRA are categorized as high-risk due to the size and shape of the uteri and cervices as well as the reduced kidney function. In addition, women with undiagnosed OHVIRA can experience genital bleeding during pregnancy and may require hospitalization. Expectant mothers are often managed with cervical sutures and C-sections to prevent fetal distress during labour.
