= Müllerian =

Müllerian may refer to:

- Müllerian mimicry, a type of mimicry or convergence named after Fritz Müller
- Müllerian ducts, which enter the cloaca of an embryo (named after Johannes Peter Müller)
- Mullerian anomalies are structural anomalies caused by errors in embryonic müllerian duct development
- Mixed Müllerian tumor
