= Metroplasty =

Surgery to repair birth defects in the uterus

- Other names: Strassman metroplasty
- Specialty: Gynaecology

Metroplasty (also called Strassman metroplasty, uteroplasty or hysteroplasty) is a reconstructive surgery used to repair congenital anomalies of the uterus, including septate uterus and bicornuate uterus. The surgery entails removing the abnormal tissue that separates the cornua of the uterus, then using several layers of stitches to create a normal shape.
