= Uterus didelphys =

Birth defect in which two uteri form

- Other names: Bicervical bicornuate uterus
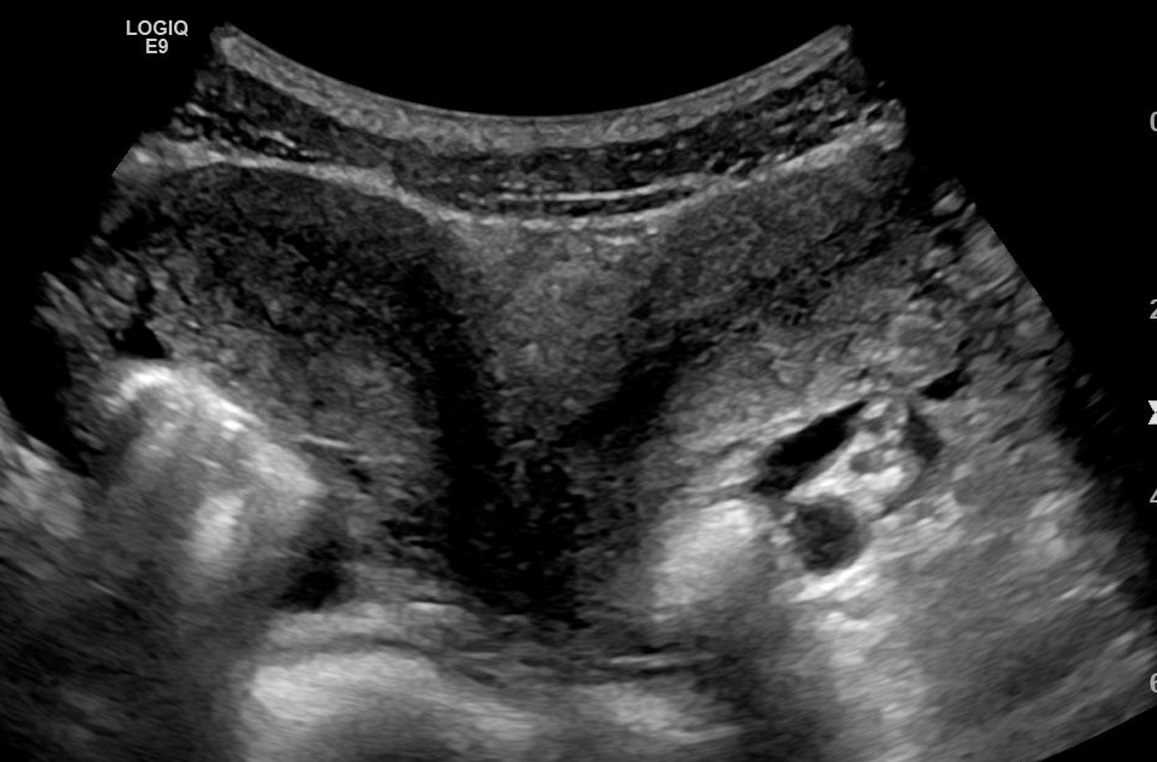
- Ultrasound showing didelphys
- Specialty: Gynecology

Uterus didelphys (from Ancient Greek di- 'two' and delphus 'womb'; sometimes also uterus didelphis) represents a uterine malformation where the uterus is present as a paired organ when the embryogenetic fusion of the Müllerian ducts fails to occur. As a result, there is a double uterus with two separate cervices, and possibly a double vagina as well. Each uterus has a single horn linked to the ipsilateral fallopian tube that faces its ovary.

Most non-human mammals have a non-single uterus with separation of horns. Marsupials and rodents have a double uterus (uterus duplex). In other animals (e.g. nematodes), the term 'didelphic' refers to a double genital tract, as opposed to monodelphic, with a single tract.

== Signs and symptoms ==
Those with the condition may be asymptomatic and unaware of having a double uterus. However, a study by Heinonen showed that certain conditions are more common. In his study of 26 women with a double uterus gynecological complaints included dysmenorrhea and dyspareunia. All patients displayed a double vagina. The fetal survival rate in 18 patients who delivered was 67.5%. Premature delivery occurred in 21% of the pregnancies. Breech presentation occurred in 43% of women and cesarean section was performed in 82% of the cases.

== Cause ==
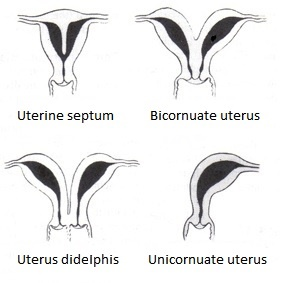
Four types of uterine malformations

The uterus is formed during embryogenesis by the fusion of the two paramesonephric ducts (also called Müllerian ducts). This process usually fuses the two Müllerian ducts into a single uterine body but fails to take place in these affected patients who maintain their double Müllerian systems. A didelphic uterus will have a double cervix and is usually associated with a double vagina. The cause of the fusion failure is not known. Associated defects may affect the vagina, the renal system and, less commonly, the skeleton.

The condition is less common than these other uterine malformations: arcuate uterus, septate uterus, and bicornuate uterus. It has been estimated to occur in 1/3,000 women. In contrast, a unicornuate uterus (in which the Müllerian ducts may or may not fuse but one does not develop properly into uterine tissue) appears to be even rarer still.

=== Syndrome ===
A specific association of uterus didelphys (double uterus), unilateral hematocolpos (inadequate draining of menstrual blood) and ipsilateral renal agenesis (having only one kidney) has been described.

== Diagnosis ==
A pelvic examination will typically reveal a double vagina and a double cervix. Investigations are usually prompted on the basis of such findings as well as when reproductive problems are encountered. Not all cases of uterus didelphys involve duplication of the cervix and vagina.

Helpful techniques to investigate the uterine structure are transvaginal ultrasonography and sonohysterography, hysterosalpingography, MRI, and hysteroscopy. More recently 3-D ultrasonography has been advocated as an excellent non-invasive method to evaluate uterine malformations.

Uterus didelphys is often confused with a complete uterine septum. Often more than one method of investigation is necessary to accurately diagnose the condition. Correct diagnosis is crucial as treatment for these two conditions are very different. Whereas most doctors recommend removal of a uterine septum, they generally concur that it is better not to operate on a uterus didelphys. In either case, a highly qualified reproductive endocrinologist should be consulted.

== Management ==
Patients with a double uterus may need special attention during pregnancy as premature birth and malpresentation are common. Cesarean section was performed in 82% of patients reported by Heinonen.

Uterus didelphys, in certain studies, has also been found associated with higher rate of infertility, miscarriage, intrauterine growth restriction, and postpartum bleed.

== Epidemiology ==
In the United States, uterus didelphys is reported to occur in 0.1–0.5% of women. It is difficult to know the exact occurrence of this anomaly, as it may go undetected in the absence of medical and reproductive complications.

== Multiple pregnancy ==
A number of twin gestations have occurred where each uterus carried its pregnancy separately. There have only been about 100 cases worldwide of a woman with a double uterus being pregnant in both wombs at the same time. Prior to 2005 only 11 cases had been reported worldwide. It is possible that the deliveries occur at different times, thus the delivery interval could be days or even weeks.

Maricia Tescu of Iași, Romania, gave birth to a premature son on December 11, 2004. Her second baby boy was born via C-section at full term 59 days later, in early February 2005.

On February 26, 2009, Sarah Reinfelder of Sault Ste. Marie, Michigan, delivered two healthy, although seven weeks premature, infants by cesarean section at Marquette General Hospital.

On September 15, 2011, Andreea Barbosa of St. Petersburg, Florida, gave birth to fraternal twins, a boy and a girl, via C-section.

On October 23, 2020, Kelly Fairhurst of Essex, England, delivered twins, a boy and a girl, at 35 weeks via a planned C-section.

On December 19 and 20, 2023 Kelsey Hatcher delivered fraternal twin girls at 39 weeks, with one girl delivered vaginally while the other was delivered by C-section the next day, at the University of Alabama at Birmingham Hospital.

=== Triplets ===
A UK woman with a double uterus gave birth to triplets in 2006. Hannah Kersey, of Northam, Devon, gave birth to a pair of identical twin girls from an egg that implanted into one womb and then divided, and to a female infant from a single egg that implanted into the other womb. This was the first known birth of viable triplets in a woman with a double uterus. A triplet pregnancy in a woman with uterus didelphys was reported from Israel in 1981; one baby died in utero, and of the remaining babies, one was delivered at 27 weeks gestation and the other 72 days later. In 2019, Arifa Sultana of Bangladesh gave premature birth in February and then via emergency Caesarean section to twins, 26 days later.

== See also ==
- Bifid penis
- Diphallia
- Hyperestrogenism
- OHVIRA
- Uterine malformation
- Trisomy X
