= Recurrent miscarriage =

Spontaneous loss of multiple pregnancies

- Other names: Habitual abortion, recurrent pregnancy loss (RPL)
- Specialty: Obstetrics

Recurrent miscarriage or recurrent pregnancy loss (RPL) is the spontaneous loss of 2–3 pregnancies that is estimated to affect up to 5% of women. The exact number of pregnancy losses and gestational weeks used to define RPL differs among medical societies.

In the majority of cases, the exact cause of pregnancy loss is unexplained despite genetic testing and a thorough evaluation. When a cause for RPL is identified, almost half are attributed to a chromosomal abnormality (ie. aneuploidy). RPL has been associated with several risk factors including parental and genetic factors (ie. advanced maternal age, chromosomal abnormalities, sperm DNA fragmentation), congenital and acquired anatomical conditions, lifestyle factors (ie. cigarette smoking, caffeine, alcohol, stress), endocrine disorders, thrombophilia (clotting disorders), immunological factors, and infections. The American Society of Reproductive Medicine recommends a thorough evaluation after 2 consecutive pregnancy losses; however, this can differ from recommendations by other medical societies.

RPL evaluation can be evaluated by numerous tests and imaging studies depending on the risk factors. These range from cytogenetic studies, blood tests for clotting disorders, hormone levels, diabetes screening, thyroid function tests, sperm analysis, antibody testing, and imaging studies. Treatment is typically tailored to the relevant risk factors and test findings. RPL can have a significant impact on the psychological well-being of couples and has been associated with higher levels of depression, anxiety, and stress. Therefore, it is recommended that appropriate screening and management (ie. pharmacologic, counseling services) be considered by medical providers.

== Epidemiology ==
Pregnancy loss, also referred to as miscarriage or spontaneous abortion, occurs in up to 25% of pregnancies. Recurrent pregnancy loss occurs less frequently and it is estimated that 5% of women experience two consecutive pregnancy losses while only 1% experience three or more.

== Etiology and risk factors ==
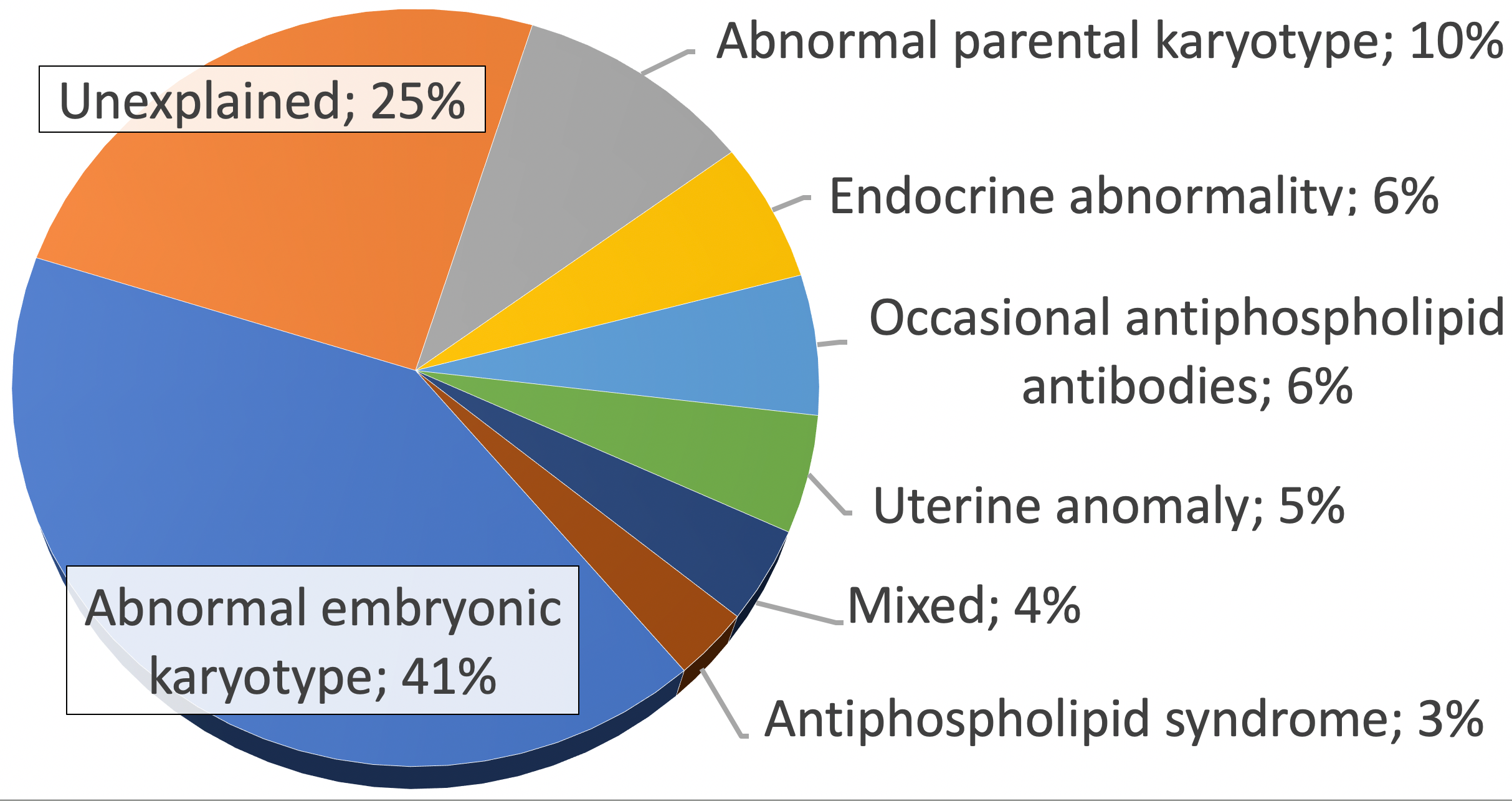
Relative incidences of causative findings in cases with recurrent miscarriage

The cause of recurrent pregnancy loss is unknown in about 50% of cases. Risk factors that have been associated with RPL include parental and genetic factors (advanced maternal age, chromosomal abnormalities, sperm DNA fragmentation), anatomical conditions, lifestyle factors, endocrine disorders, thrombophila (bleeding disorders), immunological factors, and infections. Despite thorough evaluation for these risk factors, the exact cause for recurrent pregnancy loss is unknown in about 50% of cases.

=== Parental and genetic factors ===
- Advanced maternal age: Maternal age is associated with increased risk of miscarriage with a rate of 50% in women over 40 years of age. This higher likelihood of pregnancy loss can be attributed to the higher incidence of trisomies, a chromosomal abnormality, seen in women over the age of 35.
- Chromosomal abnormalities: Recurrent pregnancy loss is most commonly found to be caused by chromosomal abnormalities in the fetus, accounting for approximately 50% of cases. These include structural aberrations (such as chromosomal inversions, insertions, deletions, and translocations) and numerical aberrations, also called aneuploidies (trisomies, monosomy X, and triploidy). These can be detected by cytogenetic testing such as karyotyping (test that analyzes the structure and quantity of chromosomes), FISH, MLPA, aCGH, and SNP array. Some research suggests that chromosomal abnormalities occur more frequently in sporadic pregnancy loss than in recurrent pregnancy loss, and the incidence of RPL is lower in women with 3 or more pregnancy losses. Parental chromosomal abnormalities is a rare cause of RPL, found in approximately 2-4% cases. Studies comparing pregnancy outcomes in couples experiencing RPL with and without chromosomal abnormalities found that parental carriers of chromosomal abnormalities had a lower live birth rate, specifically carriers of a reciprocal/balanced Robertsonian translocation. This evidence suggests that although RPL can occur in both couples with and without chromosomal aberrations, those that do are at higher risk of pregnancy loss. Previous studies produced conflicting results. Genetic evaluation of RPL is generally recommended in order to determine the need for genetic counseling and appropriate treatment. This, however, can differ among medical societies where others recommend against routine cytogenetic testing for couples experiencing RPL as it is of little clinical benefit. It is instead considered after individual risk assessment (ie. family history) and recommended to test parental chromosomes rather than the products of conception.
- Paternal Factors: There is emerging research that suggests male factors may contribute to recurrent pregnancy loss. A systematic review found that sperm DNA fragmentation, defined as breaks in the DNA strand of sperm cells, may be associated with RPL. Their findings included higher rates of SDF and other sperm parameters (ie. lower sperm number, motility, or ejaculation volume) in men experiencing RPL. No evidence of a relationship between RPL and paternal age, BMI, smoking, or alcohol use. The European Association of Urology Guidelines on Sexual and Reproductive Health therefore recommends SDF testing in cases of infertility or recurrent pregnancy loss.

=== Anatomical conditions ===
Fifteen percent of women who have experienced three or more recurring miscarriages have some anatomical reason for the inability to complete the pregnancy. The structure of the uterus has an effect on the ability to carry a child to term. Anatomical differences are common and can be congenital or acquired.

- Congenital: Congenital uterine malformations include unicornuate, septate, bicornate, didelphic, and arcuate uteri. The relationship between uterine abnormalities that are present from birth and RPL is unclear, however, there is an association with pregnancy loss. These structural anomalies are a result of disruption of the Müllerian tract during development. These can be found in approximately 12.6% of RPL cases with the highest incidences occurring in patients with septate (44.3%), bicornuate (36%), and arcuate (25.7%) uteri. These Structural uterine abnormalities can be visualized by several imaging studies including, hysterosalpingography, ultrasound, and MRI.
- Acquired: Other structural uterine anomalies such as uterine fibroids, polyps, and adhesions (also known as Asherman's syndrome) have a less clear association with recurrent pregnancy loss. Cervical weakness has been shown to lead to premature pregnancy loss resulting in miscarriages or preterm deliveries. It has been estimated that cervical insufficiency is a cause in about 8% of women with second trimester recurrent miscarriages.

=== Lifestyle factors ===
While lifestyle factors have been associated with increased risk for miscarriage in general, and are usually not listed as specific causes for RPL. These include cigarette smoking, caffeine intake, alcohol use, BMI, and stress.

- Smoking: There is limited research that directly looks at the association of cigarette smoking and RPL. Recently, a systematic review that looked at studies evaluating the link between RPL and smoking was unable to find a significant difference in risk of recurrent pregnancy loss between people that smoke and non-smokers. This review did not address e-cigarettes and vaping given that the authors did not find any studies that looked into the relationship between these forms of smoking and RPL. The relationship between smoking and the risk of miscarriage has been extensively researched. According to a systematic review and meta-analysis, there is some evidence that active cigarette smoking increases the risk of miscarriage and this risk is further increased the more cigarettes that a person smokes a day. This same review highlights that according to the Surgeon General's report in 2010, research supports that smoking during pregnancy can also lead to pregnancy complications such as placental abruption, preterm delivery, and low birthweight among other maternal health risks.
- Caffeine: research regarding the association of caffeine intake and spontaneous pregnancy loss has produced inconsistent results in previous years due to the influence of multiple factors and limitations in data collection among the studies. The same systematic review that looked at the relationship between cigarette smoking and RPL in 2021 found that there was no increased risk of RPL with the consumption of caffeine. There have been more recent studies that have assessed the relationship between caffeine and miscarriage. A systematic review found that coffee consumption before and during pregnancy was associated with a higher risk of pregnancy loss. The risk of pregnancy loss increased by 3% with each additional cup of coffee consumed during pregnancy. There was also an increased risk of pregnancy loss of 14-26% with the consumption of an additional 100 mg of caffeine (coffee, tea, soda, cacao) per day during pregnancy. This increased risk was not seen if the caffeine products were consumed prior to pregnancy. The harmful effects of caffeine during pregnancy can be attributed to its ability to absorb rapidly into the bloodstream and cross into the placenta, along with the slowed breakdown of caffeine that occurs during pregnancy which can expose the fetus to caffeine and its metabolites for a prolonged period of time. Caffeine consumption can also lead to maternal cardiovascular effects that reduce placental blood flow, putting the development of the fetus at risk.
- Alcohol Use: Prenatal exposure to alcohol has been shown to have damaging effects on the cognitive development of the fetus and has been associated with low birthweight among other features of Fetal alcohol spectrum disorders due to its teratogenic effects. Similar to smoking and caffeine consumption, research studies assessing the relationship between alcohol use and pregnancy loss have produced inconsistent results. A systematic review that looked at several maternal lifestyle factors and the risk of recurrent pregnancy loss found no statistically significant increased risk in women that consumed any form of alcohol during pregnancy compared to those that did not. These findings are similar to a recent review that looked at alcohol intake in the first and second trimester and found no increased risk of miscarriage. The authors report that this may have been due to a limited number of studies included in the review, considering the exclusion of studies that did not differentiate trimesters or account for other external factors (such as smoking, maternal age, maternal BMI) that have been linked to pregnancy loss. There is evidence that in women that drink 5 or less alcoholic drinks per week, there is a 6% increased risk of miscarriage with each additional alcoholic drink consumed when the specific trimester is not specified. Due to the inability to determine a safe range of alcohol consumption during pregnancy, multiple medical societies recommend avoiding alcohol to prevent the potential harm to the fetus.
- BMI: Maternal obesity and an elevated Body mass index (BMI) has been associated with an increased risk of miscarriage, although no clear cause has been established. Studies suggest that pregnancy loss could be influenced by the downstream effects of the hormonal disruption of the HPA axis and insulin resistance that can be associated with obesity, on the reproductive system disrupting the development of oocytes, embryos, or the integrity of the endometrium (uterine lining). Despite this evidence, research studies aimed to establish a relationship between RPL and BMI, which incorporates height and weight, have produced inconsistent results. A systematic review found that women with a history of RPL had higher BMI's by an average difference of 0.9 kg/m² than women without. These findings, however, were not statistically significant and not exclusive to BMI's within the overweight and obese range. Another review and meta-analysis found that women with a BMI above 25 were more likely to have RPL and more likely to have a subsequent miscarriage, although the quality of evidence was low given that most of the studies were observational. It is important to consider that BMI can be influenced by numerous other conditions and modifiable risk factors (ie. poor nutrition, activity level, diabetes), therefore should not be regarded as a direct cause of RPL.
- Stress: Research found that there is "increased relative risk of spontaneous abortion (odds ratio 1.28, 95% confidence interval 1.05-1.57)...for women experiencing high job stress." Another research review found that the risk of miscarriage is higher for women with a "history of exposure to psychological stress (OR 1.42, 95% CI 1.19–1.70)" However, the authors of these studies also point out that measuring stress is difficult, and that the results must therefore be interpreted with some caution. In addition, one of the studies notes that, while there are no randomized trials to study stress as it relates to pregnancy loss, one study found that a program of structured psychological support increased live birth rate among women with recurrent miscarriage.

=== Endocrine disorders ===
Women with hypothyroidism are at increased risk for pregnancy losses. Unrecognized or poorly treated diabetes mellitus leads to increased miscarriages. Women with polyendocrine metabolic ovarian syndrome (PMOS) also have higher loss rates possibly related to hyperinsulinemia or excess androgens. Inadequate production of progesterone in the luteal phase may set the stage for RPL.

- Luteal phase defect: The issue of a luteal phase defect is complex. The theory behind the concept suggests that an inadequate amount of progesterone is produced by the corpus luteum to maintain the early pregnancy. Assessment of this situation was traditionally carried out by an endometrial biopsy, however recent studies have not confirmed that such assessment is valid. Studies about the value of progesterone supplementation remain deficient, however, such supplementation is commonly carried out on an empirical basis.

=== Thrombophilia ===
An important example is the possible increased risk of miscarriage in women with thrombophilia (propensity for blood clots). The most common problem is the factor V Leiden and prothrombin G20210A mutation. Some preliminary studies suggest that anticoagulant medication may improve the chances of carrying pregnancy to term but these studies need to be confirmed before they are adopted in clinical practice. Note that many women with thrombophilia go through one or more pregnancies with no difficulties, while others may have pregnancy complications. Thrombophilia may explain up to 49–65% of recurrent miscarriages.

=== Immune factors ===
A common feature of immune factors in causing recurrent pregnancy loss appears to be a decreased maternal immune tolerance towards the fetus.

- Antiphospholipid syndrome: The antiphospholipid syndrome is an autoimmune disease that is a common cause of recurrent pregnancy loss. Around 15% of the women who have recurrent miscarriages have high levels of antiphospholipid antibodies. Women who have had more than one miscarriage in the first trimester, or a miscarriage in the second trimester, may have their blood tested for antibodies, to determine if they have antiphospholipid syndrome. Women diagnosed with antiphospholipid syndrome generally take aspirin or heparin in subsequent pregnancies, but questions remain due to the lack of high quality trials.
- Thyroid antibodies: Anti-thyroid autoantibodies are associated with an increased risk of recurrent miscarriage with an odds ratio of 2.3 with a 95% confidence interval of 1.5–3.5.
- Increased uterine NK cells: Natural killer cells, a type of white blood cell, are present in uterine tissue. High levels of these cells may be linked to RPL but high numbers or the presence of these cells is not a predictor of pregnancy loss in women who have not have had a miscarriage.
- Male-specific minor histocompatibility: Immunization of mothers against male-specific minor histocompatibility (H-Y) antigens has a pathogenic role in many cases of secondary recurrent miscarriage, that is, recurrent miscarriage in pregnancies succeeding a previous live birth. An example of this effect is that the male:female ratio of children born prior and subsequent to secondary recurrent miscarriage is 1.49 and 0.76 respectively.

=== Infection ===
There are numerous bacterial, fungal, protozoal, and viral infections that have been associated with risk of pregnancy loss, however, no direct link to recurrent pregnancy loss has been established. Infections known to increase the risk of miscarriage include bacterial vaginosis (M. hominis and U. urealyticum), syphilis, CMV, dengue fever, malaria, brucellosis, and HIV. There is mixed evidence regarding the risk of miscarriage with Chlamydia trachomatis, HPV, Hepatitis B, Toxoplasma gondii, HSV1/HSV2, and parvovirus B19.

== Assessment ==
Transvaginal ultrasonography has become the primary method of assessment of the health of an early pregnancy.

In non-pregnant patients who are evaluated for recurrent pregnancy loss the following tests are usually performed. Parental chromosome testing (karyogram) is generally recommended after 2 or 3 pregnancy losses. Blood tests for thrombophilia, ovarian function, thyroid function and diabetes are performed.

== Treatment ==
If the likely cause of recurrent pregnancy loss can be determined treatment is to be directed accordingly. In pregnant women with a history of recurrent miscarriage, anticoagulants seem to increase the live birth rate among those with antiphospholipid syndrome and perhaps those with congenital thrombophilia but not in those with unexplained recurrent miscarriage. One study found that in many women with chronic endometritis, "fertility was restored after appropriate antibiotic treatment."

For women with unexplained recurrent pregnancy loss, research suggests that specific antenatal counseling and psychological support may result in a higher chance of pregnancy success. Some research finds that for these patients psychological support and ultrasound in early pregnancy "gives 'success rates' of between 70% and 80%".

However, each additional loss worsens the prognostic for a successful pregnancy and increases the psychological and physical risks to the mother. Aspirin has no effect in preventing recurrent miscarriage in women with unexplained recurrent pregnancy loss. Immunotherapy has not been found to help.

In certain chromosomal situations, while treatment may not be available, in vitro fertilization with preimplantation genetic diagnosis may be able to identify embryos with a reduced risk of another pregnancy loss which then would be transferred. However, in vitro fertilization does not improve maternal-fetal tolerance imbalances.

== Psychological Impact ==
Experiencing pregnancy loss can have a significant and at times prolonged psychological impact, including higher levels of stress anxiety, and depression. There is evidence that women struggling with recurrent pregnancy loss in particular may be affected to a greater degree. Grief is a normal and expected response to the loss of a pregnancy. However, prolonged and intense grief can be significantly distressing and detrimental to the mental health of the individual. This can particularly be seen in women that developed maladaptive coping mechanisms following a miscarriage, isolated themselves as a result of the cultural and societal stigma, or received inadequate social support from medical providers, partners, families, and other personal relationships. In heterosexual couples, men also experience grief as a result of pregnancy loss and have reported feeling obligated to disregard their feelings in order to support their partner. The psychological effects of RPL on paternal emotional and mental wellbeing has not been studied extensively, however, there are emerging studies that further look into this. According to a recent meta-analysis that compared the psychological impact among men and women with a history of RPL, women were found to have higher levels of moderate to severe depression, stress, and anxiety than women without RPL and than men who experienced RPL.

Given the impact that RPL can have on the mental health and psychologic well-being of couples, mental health evaluation, anxiety/depression screening, and treatment can be considered. There is also emerging research that suggests that untreated depression and depressive symptoms can lead to adverse outcomes in future pregnancies such as preterm birth and low Apgar scores. Consequently, there has been a rise in antidepressant (ie. SSRI) use during pregnancy over the last few years with a prevalence of 1-8%. This decision should be made with the guidance of a medical provider given the teratogenicity and potential adverse effects of antidepressants on the fetus.

In addition to psychotherapy, psychological care for people experiencing recurrent pregnancy loss can include counseling and other supportive services. There is some evidence to support that women that received bereavement counseling (based on the Guidelines for Medical Professionals Providing Care to the Family Experiencing Perinatal Loss, Neonatal Death, SIDS, or other Infant Death) after pregnancy loss were able to cope better, with women reporting 50% less despair than those that did not receive this intervention.

== Prognosis ==
Recurrent miscarriage in itself is associated with later development of coronary artery disease with an odds ratio of approximately 2, increased risk of ovarian cancer, increased risk of cardiovascular complications, and an increased risk of all-cause mortality of 44%, 86%, and 150% for women with a history of 1, 2, or 3 miscarriages, respectively.

Women with a history of recurrent miscarriage are at risk of developing preeclampsia in later pregnancies.

== Bibliography ==
- Hoffman, Barbara (2012). Williams gynecology. New York: McGraw-Hill Medical. ISBN 978-0-07-171672-7.
