= Miscarriage =

Natural premature termination of pregnancy

Spontaneous abortion
- Other names: miscarriage, early pregnancy loss
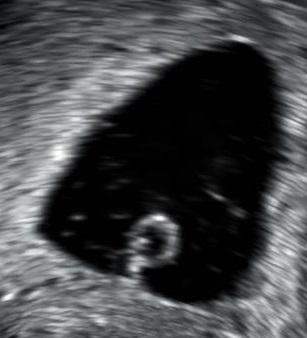
- An ultrasound showing a gestational sac containing a yolk sac but no embryo
- Specialty: Obstetrics and Gynaecology, Neonatology, Pediatrics
- Symptoms: Vaginal bleeding with or without pain
- Complications: Infection, bleeding, sadness, anxiety, guilt
- Usual onset: Before 20 weeks of pregnancy
- Causes: Chromosomal abnormalities, uterine abnormalities
- Risk factors: Being an older parent, previous miscarriage, exposure to tobacco smoke, obesity, diabetes, autoimmune diseases, drug or alcohol use
- Diagnostic method: Physical examination, human chorionic gonadotropin, ultrasound
- Differential diagnosis: Ectopic pregnancy, implantation bleeding.
- Prevention: Prenatal care
- Treatment: Expectant management, vacuum aspiration, emotional support
- Frequency: 10–50% of pregnancies

Miscarriage, also known in medical terms as a spontaneous abortion, is an end to pregnancy resulting in the loss and expulsion of an embryo or fetus from the womb before it can survive independently. Miscarriage before six weeks of gestation is defined as biochemical loss by ESHRE. Once ultrasound or histological evidence shows that a pregnancy has existed, the term used is clinical miscarriage, which can be "early" (before 12 weeks) or "late" (between 12 and 21 weeks). Spontaneous fetal termination after 20 weeks of gestation is known as a stillbirth. The term miscarriage is sometimes used to refer to all forms of pregnancy loss and pregnancy with abortive outcomes before 20 weeks of gestation.

The most common symptom of a miscarriage is vaginal bleeding, with or without pain. Tissue and clot-like material may leave the uterus and pass through and out of the vagina. Risk factors for miscarriage include being an older parent, previous miscarriage, exposure to tobacco smoke, obesity, diabetes, thyroid problems, and drug or alcohol use. About 80% of miscarriages occur in the first 12 weeks of pregnancy (the first trimester). The underlying cause in about half of cases involves chromosomal abnormalities. Diagnosis of a miscarriage may involve checking to see if the cervix is open or sealed, testing blood levels of human chorionic gonadotropin (hCG), and an ultrasound. Other conditions that can produce similar symptoms include an ectopic pregnancy and implantation bleeding.

Prevention is occasionally possible with good prenatal care. Avoiding drugs (including alcohol), infectious diseases, and radiation may decrease the risk of miscarriage. No specific treatment is usually needed during the first seven to 14 days. Most miscarriages will be completed without additional interventions. Occasionally the medication misoprostol or a procedure such as vacuum aspiration is used to remove the remaining tissue. Women who have a blood type of rhesus negative (Rh negative) may require Rho(D) immune globulin. Pain medication may be beneficial. Feelings of sadness, anxiety or guilt may occur following a miscarriage. Emotional support may help with processing the loss.

Miscarriage is the most common complication of early pregnancy. Among women who know they are pregnant, the miscarriage rate is roughly 10% to 20%, while rates among all fertilisation is around 30% to 50%. In those under the age of 35, the risk is about 10% while in those over the age of 40, the risk is about 45%. Risk begins to increase around the age of 30. About 5% of women have two miscarriages in a row. Recurrent miscarriage (also referred to medically as recurrent spontaneous abortion or RSA) may also be considered a form of infertility.

== Terminology ==
Some recommend not using the term "abortion" in discussions with those experiencing a miscarriage to decrease distress. In Britain, the term "miscarriage" has replaced any use of the term "spontaneous abortion" for pregnancy loss and in response to complaints of insensitivity towards women who had suffered such loss. An additional benefit of this change is reducing confusion among medical laymen, who may not realize that the term "spontaneous abortion" refers to a naturally occurring medical phenomenon and not the intentional termination of pregnancy.

The medical terminology applied to experiences during early pregnancy has changed over time. Before the 1980s, health professionals used the phrase spontaneous abortion for a miscarriage and induced abortion for a termination of the pregnancy. By the 1940s, the popular assumption that an abortion was an intentional and immoral or criminal action was sufficiently ingrained that pregnancy books had to explain that abortion was the then-popular technical jargon for miscarriages.

In the 1960s, the use of the word miscarriage in Britain (instead of spontaneous abortion) occurred after changes in legislation. In the late 1980s and 1990s, doctors became more conscious of their language about early pregnancy loss. Some medical authors advocated a change to the use of miscarriage instead of spontaneous abortion because they argued this would be more respectful and help ease a distressing experience. The change was being recommended in Britain in the late 1990s. In 2005, the European Society for Human Reproduction and Embryology (ESHRE) published a paper aiming to facilitate a revision of nomenclature used to describe early pregnancy events.

Most affected women and family members refer to miscarriage as the loss of a baby, rather than an embryo or fetus, and healthcare providers are expected to respect and use the language that the person chooses. Clinical terms can suggest blame, increase distress, and even cause anger. Terms that are known to cause distress in those experiencing miscarriage include:

- abortion (including spontaneous abortion) rather than miscarriage,
- habitual aborter rather than a woman experiencing recurrent pregnancy loss,
- products of conception rather than baby,
- blighted ovum rather than early pregnancy loss or delayed miscarriage,
- cervical incompetence rather than cervical weakness, and
- evacuation of retained products of conception (ERPC) rather than surgical management of miscarriage.

Using the word abortion for an involuntary miscarriage is generally considered confusing, "a dirty word", "stigmatized", and "an all-around hated term".

Pregnancy loss is a broad term that is used for miscarriage, ectopic, and molar pregnancies. The term foetal death applies variably in different countries and contexts, sometimes incorporating weight, and gestational age from 16 weeks in Norway, 20 weeks in the US and Australia, 24 weeks in the UK, to 26 weeks in Italy and Spain. A foetus that died before birth after this gestational age may be referred to as a stillbirth.

== Signs and symptoms ==
Signs of a miscarriage include vaginal spotting, abdominal pain, cramping, fluid, blood clots, and tissue passing from the vagina. Bleeding can be a symptom of miscarriage, but many women also have bleeding in early pregnancy and do not miscarry. Bleeding during the first half of pregnancy may be referred to as a threatened miscarriage. Of those who seek treatment for bleeding during pregnancy, about half will miscarry. Miscarriage may be detected during an ultrasound exam or through serial human chorionic gonadotropin (HCG) testing.

== Risk factors ==
Miscarriage may occur for many reasons, not all of which can be identified. Risk factors are those things that increase the likelihood of having a miscarriage but do not necessarily cause a miscarriage. Up to 70 conditions, infections, medical procedures, lifestyle factors, occupational exposures, chemical exposure, and shift work are associated with increased risk for miscarriage. Some of these risks include endocrine, genetic, uterine, or hormonal abnormalities, reproductive tract infections, and tissue rejection caused by an autoimmune disorder.

=== Trimesters ===
==== First trimester ====
Chromosomal abnormalities found in first-trimester miscarriages
| Description | Proportion of total |
|---|---|
| Normal | 45–55% |
| Autosomal trisomy | 22–32% |
| Monosomy X (45, X) | 5–20% |
| Triploidy | 6–8% |
| Structural abnormality of the chromosome | 2% |
| Double or triple trisomy | 0.7–2.0% |
| Translocation | Unknown |

Most clinically apparent miscarriages (two-thirds to three-quarters in various studies) occur during the first trimester. About 30% to 40% of all fertilised eggs miscarry, often before the pregnancy is known. The embryo typically dies before the pregnancy is expelled; bleeding into the decidua basalis and tissue necrosis cause uterine contractions to expel the pregnancy. Early miscarriages can be due to a developmental abnormality of the placenta or other embryonic tissues. In some instances, an embryo does not form, but other tissues do. This has been called a "blighted ovum".

Successful implantation of the zygote into the uterus is most likely eight to ten days after fertilization. If the zygote has not been implanted by day ten, implantation becomes increasingly unlikely in subsequent days.

A chemical pregnancy is a pregnancy that was detected by testing but ends in miscarriage before or around the time of the next expected period.

Chromosomal abnormalities are found in more than half of embryos miscarried in the first 13 weeks. Half of embryonic miscarriages (25% of all miscarriages) have an aneuploidy (abnormal number of chromosomes). Common chromosome abnormalities found in miscarriages include an autosomal trisomy (22–32%), monosomy X (5–20%), triploidy (6–8%), tetraploidy (2–4%), or other structural chromosomal abnormalities (2%). Genetic problems are more likely to occur with older parents; this may account for the higher rates observed in older women.

Luteal phase progesterone deficiency may or may not be a contributing factor to miscarriage.

==== Second and third trimesters ====
Second-trimester losses may be due to maternal factors such as uterine malformation, growths in the uterus (fibroids), or cervical problems. These conditions also may contribute to premature birth. Unlike first-trimester miscarriages, second-trimester miscarriages are less likely to be caused by a genetic abnormality; chromosomal aberrations are found in a third of cases. Infection during the third trimester can cause a miscarriage.

=== Age ===
Miscarriage is least common for mothers in their twenties, for whom around 12% of known pregnancies end in miscarriage. Risk rises with age: around 14% for women aged 30–34; 18% for those 35–39; 37% for those 40–44; and 65% for those over 45. Women younger than 20 have a slightly increased miscarriage risk, with around 16% of known pregnancies ending in miscarriage.

Miscarriage risk also rises with paternal age, although the effect is less pronounced than for maternal age. The risk is lowest for men under 40 years old. For men aged 40-44, the risk is around 23% higher. For men over 45, the risk is 43% higher.

=== Obesity, eating disorders, and caffeine ===
Not only is obesity associated with miscarriage, but it can also result in sub-fertility and other adverse pregnancy outcomes. Recurrent miscarriage is also related to obesity. Women with bulimia nervosa and anorexia nervosa may have a greater risk for miscarriage. Nutrient deficiencies have not been found to impact miscarriage rates, but hyperemesis gravidarum sometimes precedes a miscarriage.

Caffeine consumption also has been correlated to miscarriage rates, at least at higher levels of intake. However, such higher rates are statistically significant only in certain circumstances.

Vitamin supplementation has generally not been shown to be effective in preventing miscarriage. Chinese traditional medicine has not been found to prevent miscarriage.

=== Endocrine disorders ===
Disorders of the thyroid may affect pregnancy outcomes. Related to this, iodine deficiency is strongly associated with an increased risk of miscarriage. The risk of miscarriage is increased in those with poorly controlled insulin-dependent diabetes mellitus. Women with well-controlled diabetes have the same risk of miscarriage as those without diabetes.

=== Food poisoning ===
Ingesting food that has been contaminated with listeriosis, toxoplasmosis, and salmonella is associated with an increased risk of miscarriage.

=== Amniocentesis and chorionic villus sampling ===
Amniocentesis and chorionic villus sampling (CVS) are procedures conducted to assess the fetus. A sample of amniotic fluid is obtained by the insertion of a needle through the abdomen and into the uterus. Chorionic villus sampling is a similar procedure, with a sample of tissue removed rather than fluid. These procedures are not associated with pregnancy loss during the second trimester, but they are associated with miscarriages and birth defects in the first trimester. Miscarriage caused by invasive prenatal diagnosis (chorionic villus sampling (CVS) and amniocentesis) is rare (about 1%).

=== Surgery ===
The effects of surgery on pregnancy are not well-known, including the effects of bariatric surgery. Abdominal and pelvic surgery are not risk factors for miscarriage. Ovarian tumours and cysts that are removed have not been found to increase the risk of miscarriage. The exception to this is the removal of the corpus luteum from the ovary. This can cause fluctuations in the hormones necessary to maintain the pregnancy.

=== Medications ===
There is no significant association between antidepressant medication exposure and miscarriage. The risk of miscarriage is not likely decreased by discontinuing SSRIs before pregnancy. Some available data suggest that there is a small increased risk of miscarriage for women taking any antidepressant, though this risk becomes less statistically significant when excluding studies of poor quality.

Medicines that increase the risk of miscarriage include:

- retinoids
- nonsteroidal anti-inflammatory drugs (NSAIDs), such as ibuprofen
- misoprostol
- methotrexate
- statins

=== Immunizations ===
Immunizations have not been found to cause miscarriage. Live vaccinations, like the MMR vaccine, can theoretically cause damage to the fetus as the live virus can cross the placenta and potentially increase the risk for miscarriage. Therefore, the Center for Disease Control (CDC) recommends against pregnant women receiving live vaccinations. However, there is no clear evidence that has shown live vaccinations increase the risk of miscarriage or fetal abnormalities.

Some live vaccinations include: MMR, varicella, certain types of the influenza vaccine, and rotavirus.

=== Treatments for cancer ===
Ionising radiation levels given to a woman during cancer treatment cause miscarriage. Exposure can also impact fertility. The use of chemotherapeutic drugs to treat childhood cancer increases the risk of future miscarriage.

=== Pre-existing diseases ===
Several pre-existing diseases in pregnancy can potentially increase the risk of miscarriage, including diabetes, endometriosis, polyendocrine metabolic ovarian syndrome (PMOS), hypothyroidism, certain infectious diseases, and autoimmune diseases. Women with endometriosis report a 76% to 298% increase in miscarriages versus their non-afflicted peers, the range affected by the severity of their disease. PMOS may increase the risk of miscarriage. Two studies suggested treatment with the drug metformin significantly lowers the rate of miscarriage in women with PMOS, but the quality of these studies has been questioned. Metformin treatment in pregnancy is not safe. In 2007, the Royal College of Obstetricians and Gynaecologists also recommended against the use of the drug to prevent miscarriage. Thrombophilias or defects in coagulation and bleeding were once thought to be a risk of miscarriage but have been subsequently questioned. Severe cases of hypothyroidism increase the risk of miscarriage. The effect of milder cases of hypothyroidism on miscarriage rates has not been established. A condition called luteal phase defect (LPD) is a failure of the uterine lining to be fully prepared for pregnancy. This can keep a fertilised egg from implanting or result in miscarriage.

Mycoplasma genitalium infection is associated with an increased risk of preterm birth and miscarriage.

Infections can increase the risk of a miscarriage: rubella (German measles), cytomegalovirus, bacterial vaginosis, HIV, chlamydia, gonorrhoea, syphilis, and malaria.

=== Immune status ===
Autoimmunity is a possible cause of recurrent or late-term miscarriages. In the case of an autoimmune-induced miscarriage, the woman's body attacks the growing fetus or prevents normal pregnancy progression. Autoimmune disease may cause abnormalities in embryos, which in turn may lead to miscarriage. As an example, coeliac disease increases the risk of miscarriage by an odds ratio of approximately 1.4. A disruption in normal immune function can lead to the formation of antiphospholipid antibody syndrome. This will affect the ability to continue the pregnancy, and if a woman has repeated miscarriages, she can be tested for it. Approximately 15% of recurrent miscarriages are related to immunologic factors. The presence of anti-thyroid autoantibodies is associated with an increased risk with an odds ratio of 3.73 and 95% confidence interval 1.8–7.6. Having lupus also increases the risk of miscarriage. Immunohistochemical studies on decidual basalis and chorionic villi found that the imbalance of the immunological environment could be associated with recurrent pregnancy loss.

=== Anatomical defects and trauma ===
Fifteen per cent of women who have experienced three or more recurring miscarriages have some anatomical defect that prevents the pregnancy from being carried to term. The structure of the uterus affects the ability to carry a child to term. Anatomical differences are common and can be congenital.

| Type of uterine structure | Miscarriage rate associated with defect | References |
|---|---|---|
| Bicornate uterus | 40–79% | |
| Septate or unicornate | 34–88% | |
| Arcuate | Unknown | |
| Didelphys | 40% | |
| Fibroids | Unknown | |

In some women, cervical incompetence or cervical insufficiency occurs with the inability of the cervix to stay closed during the entire pregnancy. It does not cause first-trimester miscarriages. In the second trimester, it is associated with an increased risk of miscarriage. It is identified after a premature birth has occurred at about 16–18 weeks into the pregnancy. During the second trimester, major trauma can result in a miscarriage.

=== Smoking ===
Tobacco (cigarette) smokers have an increased risk of miscarriage. There is an increased risk regardless of which parent smokes, though the risk is higher when the gestational mother smokes.

=== Morning sickness ===
Nausea and vomiting of pregnancy (NVP, or morning sickness) are associated with a decreased risk. Several possible causes have been suggested for morning sickness but there is still no agreement. NVP may represent a defence mechanism which discourages the mother's ingestion of foods that are harmful to the fetus; according to this model, a lower frequency of miscarriage would be an expected consequence of the different food choices made by women experiencing NVP.

=== Chemicals and occupational exposure ===
Chemical and occupational exposures may have some effect on pregnancy outcomes. A cause-and-effect relationship can rarely be established. Those chemicals that are implicated in increasing the risk for miscarriage are DDT, lead, formaldehyde, arsenic, benzene and ethylene oxide. Video display terminals and ultrasound have not been found to affect the rates of miscarriage. In dental offices where nitrous oxide is used with the absence of anaesthetic gas scavenging equipment, there is a greater risk of miscarriage. For women who work with cytotoxic antineoplastic chemotherapeutic agents, there is a small increased risk of miscarriage. No increased risk for cosmetologists has been found.

=== Other ===
Alcohol increases the risk of miscarriage. Cocaine use increases the rate of miscarriage. Some infections have been associated with miscarriage. These include Ureaplasma urealyticum, Mycoplasma hominis, group B streptococci, HIV-1, and syphilis. Chlamydia trachomatis may increase the risk of miscarriage. Toxoplasmosis can cause a miscarriage. Subclinical infections of the lining of the womb, commonly known as chronic endometritis, are also associated with poor pregnancy outcomes, compared to women with treated chronic endometritis or no chronic endometritis.

== Diagnosis ==
In the case of blood loss, pain, or both, transvaginal ultrasound is performed. If a viable intrauterine pregnancy is not found with ultrasound, blood tests (serial βHCG tests) can be performed to rule out ectopic pregnancy, which is a life-threatening situation.

If hypotension, tachycardia, and anaemia are discovered, the exclusion of an ectopic pregnancy is important.

A miscarriage may be confirmed by an obstetric ultrasound and by the examination of the passed tissue. When looking for microscopic pathologic symptoms, one looks for the products of conception. Microscopically, these include villi, trophoblast, fetal parts, and background gestational changes in the endometrium. When chromosomal abnormalities are found in more than one miscarriage, genetic testing of both parents may be done.

=== Ultrasound criteria ===
A review article in The New England Journal of Medicine based on a consensus meeting of the Society of Radiologists in Ultrasound in America (SRU) has suggested that miscarriage should be diagnosed only if any of the following criteria are met upon ultrasonography visualisation:

| Miscarriage diagnosed | Miscarriage suspected | References |
|---|---|---|
| Crown-rump length of at least 7 mm and no heartbeat. | Crown–rump length of less than 7 mm and no heartbeat. | |
| Mean gestational sac diameter of at least 25 mm and no embryo. | Mean gestational sac diameter of 16–24 mm and no embryo. | |
| Absence of embryo with heartbeat at least 2 weeks after an ultrasound scan that showed a gestational sac without a yolk sac. | Absence of embryo with heartbeat 7–13 days after an ultrasound scan that showed a gestational sac without a yolk sac. | |
| Absence of embryo with heartbeat at least 11 days after an ultrasound scan that showed a gestational sac with a yolk sac. | Absence of embryo with heartbeat 7–10 days after a scan that showed a gestational sac with a yolk sac. | |
| | Absence of embryo at least 6 weeks after last menstrual period. | |
| | Amniotic sac seen adjacent to the yolk sac, and with no visible embryo. | |
| | Yolk sac of more than 7 mm. | |
| | Small gestational sac compared to embryo size (less than 5 mm difference between mean sac diameter and crown-rump length). | |

=== Classification ===
A threatened miscarriage is any bleeding during the first half of pregnancy. At the investigation, it may be found that the foetus remains viable and the pregnancy continues without further problems.

An anembryonic pregnancy (also called an "empty sac" or "blighted ovum") is a condition where the gestational sac develops normally, while the embryonic part of the pregnancy is either absent or stops growing very early. This accounts for approximately half of miscarriages. All other miscarriages are classified as embryonic miscarriages, meaning that there is an embryo present in the gestational sac. Half of embryonic miscarriages have aneuploidy (an abnormal number of chromosomes).

An inevitable miscarriage occurs when the cervix has already dilated, but the foetus has yet to be expelled. This usually will progress to a complete miscarriage. The foetus may or may not have cardiac activity.

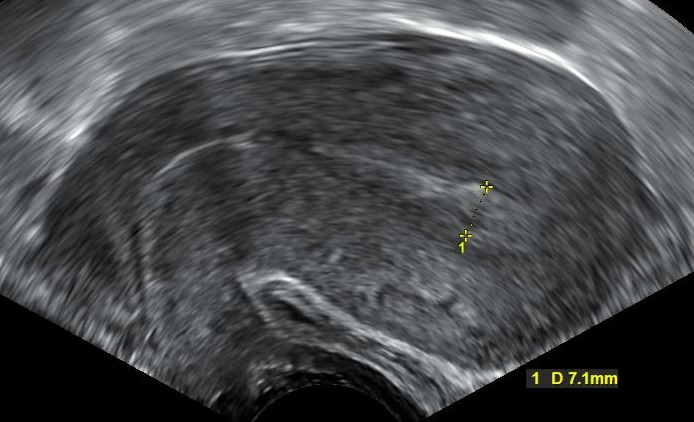
Transvaginal ultrasonography after an episode of heavy bleeding in an intrauterine pregnancy that had been confirmed by previous ultrasonography. There is some widening between the uterine walls, but no sign of any gestational sac, thus, in this case, being diagnostic of a complete miscarriage.

A complete miscarriage is when all products of conception have been expelled; these may include the trophoblast, chorionic villi, gestational sac, yolk sac, and fetal pole (embryo); or later in the pregnancy the foetus, umbilical cord, placenta, amniotic fluid, and amniotic membrane. The presence of a pregnancy test that is still positive, as well as an empty uterus upon transvaginal ultrasonography, does, however, fulfil the definition of pregnancy of unknown location. Therefore, there may be a need for follow-up pregnancy tests to ensure that there is no remaining pregnancy, including ectopic pregnancy.

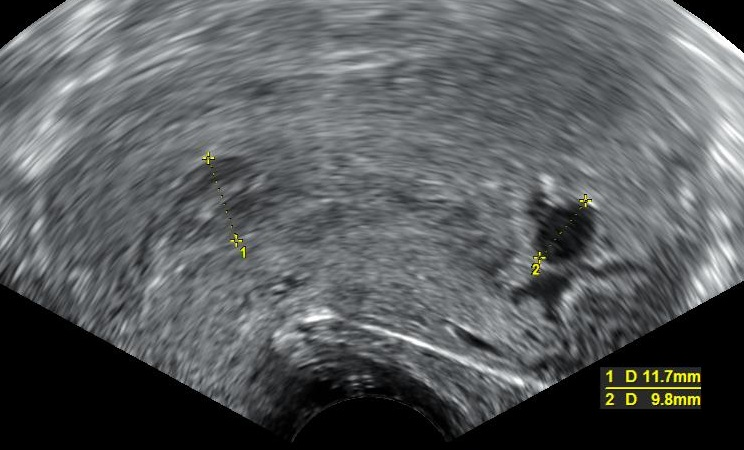
Transvaginal ultrasonography, with some products of conception in the cervix (to the left in the image) and remnants of a gestational sac by the fundus (to the right in the image), indicating an incomplete miscarriage

An incomplete miscarriage occurs when some products of conception have been passed, but some remain inside the uterus. However, an increased distance between the uterine walls on transvaginal ultrasonography may also simply be an increased endometrial thickness and/or a polyp. The use of a Doppler ultrasound may be better in confirming the presence of significant retained products of conception in the uterine cavity. In cases of uncertainty, ectopic pregnancy must be excluded using techniques like serial beta-hCG measurements.

A 13-week fetus without cardiac activity located in the uterus (delayed or missed miscarriage)

A missed miscarriage is when the embryo or fetus has died, but a miscarriage has not yet occurred. This type of miscarriage is also referred to as delayed miscarriage, silent miscarriage, or missed abortion.

A septic miscarriage occurs when the tissue from a missed or incomplete miscarriage becomes infected, which carries the risk of spreading infection (sepsis) and can be fatal.

Recurrent miscarriage ("recurrent pregnancy loss" (RPL), "recurrent spontaneous abortion (RSA), or "habitual abortion") is the occurrence of multiple consecutive miscarriages; the exact number used to diagnose recurrent miscarriage varies; however, two is the minimum threshold to meet the criteria. If the proportion of pregnancies ending in miscarriage is 15% and assuming that miscarriages are independent events, then the probability of two consecutive miscarriages is 2.25% and the probability of three consecutive miscarriages is 0.34%. The occurrence of recurrent pregnancy loss is 1%. A large majority (85%) of those who have had two miscarriages will conceive and carry normally afterward.

The physical symptoms of a miscarriage vary according to the length of pregnancy, though most miscarriages cause pain or cramping. The size of blood clots and pregnancy tissue that are passed becomes larger with longer gestations. After 13 weeks' gestation, there is a higher risk of placenta retention.

== Prevention ==
Prevention of a miscarriage can sometimes be accomplished by decreasing risk factors. This may include good prenatal care, avoiding drugs and alcohol, preventing infectious diseases, and avoiding X-rays. Identifying the cause of the miscarriage may help prevent future pregnancy loss, especially in cases of recurrent miscarriage. Often, there is little a person can do to prevent a miscarriage. Vitamin supplementation before or during pregnancy has not been found to affect the risk of miscarriage. Progesterone has been shown to prevent miscarriage in women with 1) vaginal bleeding early in their current pregnancy and 2) a previous history of miscarriage.

=== Non-modifiable risk factors ===
Preventing a miscarriage in subsequent pregnancies may be enhanced with assessments of:

- Immune status
- Chemical and occupational exposures
- Anatomical defects
- Pre-existing or acquired disease in pregnancy
  - Polyendocrine metabolic ovarian syndrome
- Previous exposure to chemotherapy and radiation
- Medications
- Surgical history
- Endocrine disorders
- Genetic abnormalities

=== Modifiable risk factors ===
Maintaining a healthy weight and good prenatal care can reduce the risk of miscarriage. Some risk factors can be minimized by avoiding the following:

- Smoking
- Cocaine use
- Alcohol
- Poor nutrition
- Occupational exposure to agents that can cause miscarriage
- Medications associated with miscarriage
- Substance use

== Management ==
Women who miscarry early in their pregnancy usually do not require any subsequent medical treatment, but they can benefit from support and counseling. Most early miscarriages will be completed on their own; in other cases, medication treatment or aspiration of the products of conception can be used to remove the remaining tissue. While bed rest has been advocated to prevent miscarriage, this is not of benefit. Those who are experiencing or who have experienced a miscarriage benefit from the use of careful medical language. Significant distress can often be managed by the ability of the clinician to clearly explain terms without suggesting that the woman or couple is somehow to blame.

Evidence to support Rho(D) immune globulin after a spontaneous miscarriage is unclear. In the UK, Rho(D) immune globulin is recommended in Rh-negative women after 12 weeks gestational age and before 12 weeks gestational age in those who need surgery or medication to complete the miscarriage.

=== Methods ===
No treatment is necessary for a diagnosis of complete miscarriage (so long as ectopic pregnancy is ruled out). In cases of an incomplete miscarriage, empty sac, or missed abortion, there are three treatment options: watchful waiting, medical management, and surgical treatment. With no treatment (watchful waiting), most miscarriages (65–80%) will pass naturally within two to six weeks. This treatment avoids the possible side effects and complications of medications and surgery, but increases the risk of mild bleeding, the need for unplanned surgical treatment, and incomplete miscarriage. Medical treatment usually consists of using misoprostol (a prostaglandin) alone or in combination with mifepristone pre-treatment. These medications help the uterus to contract and expel the remaining tissue out of the body. This works within a few days in 95% of cases. Vacuum aspiration or sharp curettage can be used, with vacuum aspiration being lower-risk and more common.

=== Delayed and incomplete miscarriage ===
In a delayed or incomplete miscarriage, treatment depends on the amount of tissue remaining in the uterus. Treatment can include surgical removal of the tissue with vacuum aspiration or misoprostol. Studies looking at the methods of anaesthesia for surgical management of incomplete miscarriage have not shown that any adaptation from normal practice is beneficial.

=== Induced miscarriage ===
An induced abortion may be performed by a qualified healthcare provider for women who cannot continue the pregnancy. Self-induced abortion performed by a woman or non-medical personnel can be dangerous and is still a cause of maternal mortality in some countries. In some locales, it is illegal or carries heavy social stigma.

=== Sex ===
Some organisations recommend delaying sex after a miscarriage until the bleeding has stopped to decrease the risk of infection. However, there is not sufficient evidence for the routine use of antibiotics to try to avoid infection in incomplete abortion. Others recommend delaying attempts at pregnancy until one period has occurred to make it easier to determine the dates of a subsequent pregnancy. There is no evidence that getting pregnant in that first cycle affects outcomes, and an early subsequent pregnancy may improve outcomes.

=== Support ===
Organisations exist that provide information and counselling to help those who have had a miscarriage. Family and friends often conduct a memorial or burial service. Hospitals can provide support and help memorialise the event. Depending on the locale, others desire to have a private ceremony. Providing appropriate support with frequent discussions and sympathetic counselling is part of the evaluation and treatment. Those who experience unexplained miscarriages can be treated with emotional support.

=== Miscarriage leave ===
Miscarriage leave is a leave of absence concerning miscarriage. The following countries offer paid or unpaid leave to women who have had a miscarriage.

- The Philippines – 60 days' fully paid leave for miscarriages (before 20 weeks of gestation) or emergency termination of the pregnancy (on the 20th week or after) The husband of the mother gets seven days' fully paid leave up to the 4th pregnancy.
- India – six weeks' leave
- New Zealand – three days' bereavement leave for both parents
- Mauritius – two weeks' leave
- Indonesia – six weeks' leave
- Taiwan – five days, one week, or four weeks, depending on how advanced the pregnancy was
- Northern Ireland – two weeks' paid leave for both parents, no matter at what stage the miscarriage occurs.

== Outcomes ==
=== Psychological and emotional effects ===
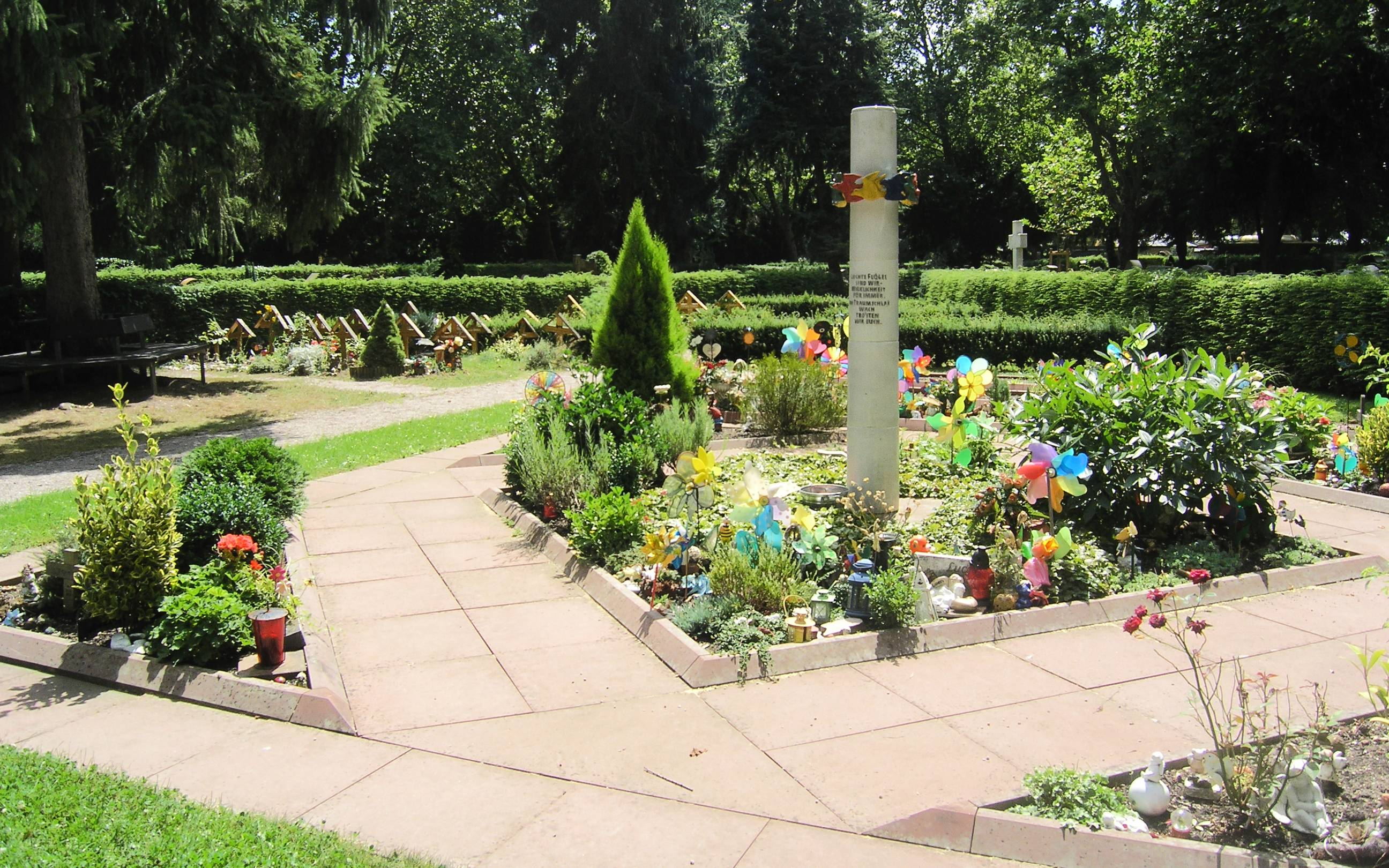
A cemetery for miscarried fetuses, stillborn babies, and babies who have died soon after birth

Every woman's personal experience of miscarriage is different, and women who have more than one miscarriage may react differently to each event.

In Western cultures since the 1980s, medical providers assume that experiencing a miscarriage "is a major loss for all pregnant women". A miscarriage can result in anxiety, depression, or stress for those involved. It can affect the whole family. Many of those experiencing a miscarriage go through a grieving process. "Prenatal attachment" often exists that can be seen as parental sensitivity, love and preoccupation directed towards the unborn child. Serious emotional impact is usually experienced immediately after the miscarriage. Some may go through the same loss when an ectopic pregnancy is terminated. In some, the realisation of the loss can take weeks. Providing family support to those experiencing the loss can be challenging because some find comfort in talking about the miscarriage, while others may find the event painful to discuss. The father can have the same sense of loss. Expressing feelings of grief and loss can sometimes be harder for men. Some women can begin planning their next pregnancy after a few weeks of having a miscarriage. For others, planning another pregnancy can be difficult. Some facilities acknowledge the loss. Parents can name and hold their infant. They may be given mementos such as photos and footprints. Some conduct a funeral or memorial service. They may express the loss by planting a tree.

Some health organizations recommend that sexual activity be delayed after a miscarriage. The menstrual cycle should resume after about three to four months. Women reported that they were dissatisfied with the care they received from physicians and nurses.

=== Subsequent pregnancies ===
Some parents want to try to have a baby very soon after the miscarriage. The decision to try to become pregnant again can be difficult. Reasons exist that may prompt parents to consider another pregnancy. For older mothers, there may be some sense of urgency. Other parents are optimistic that future pregnancies are likely to be successful. Many are hesitant and want to know about the risk of having another or more miscarriages. Some clinicians recommend that the women have one menstrual cycle before attempting another pregnancy. This is because the date of conception may be hard to determine. Also, the first menstrual cycle after a miscarriage can be much longer or shorter than expected. Parents may be advised to wait even longer if they have experienced a late miscarriage or molar pregnancy, or are undergoing tests. Some parents wait for six months based on recommendations from their healthcare provider.

Research shows that depression after a miscarriage or stillbirth can continue for years, even after the birth of a subsequent child. Medical professionals are advised to take previous loss of a pregnancy into account when assessing risks for postnatal depression following the birth of a subsequent infant. It is believed that supportive interventions may improve the health outcomes of both the mother and the child.

The risks of having another miscarriage vary according to the cause. The risk of having another miscarriage after a molar pregnancy is very low. The risk of another miscarriage is highest after the third miscarriage. Pre-conception care is available in some locales.

=== Later cardiovascular disease ===
There is a significant association between miscarriage and later development of coronary artery disease, but not cerebrovascular disease.

== Epidemiology ==
Around 15% of known pregnancies end in miscarriage, totaling around 23 million miscarriages per year worldwide. Miscarriage rates among all fertilized zygotes are around 30% to 50%. A 2012 review found the risk of miscarriage between 5 and 20 weeks from 11% to 22%. Up to the 13th week of pregnancy, the risk of miscarriage each week was around 2%, dropping to 1% in week 14 and reducing slowly between 14 and 20 weeks.

The precise rate is not known because a large number of miscarriages occur before pregnancies become established and before the woman is aware she is pregnant. Additionally, those with bleeding in early pregnancy may seek medical care more often than those not experiencing bleeding. Although some studies attempt to account for this by recruiting women who are planning pregnancies and testing for very early pregnancy, they still are not representative of the wider population.

In 2010, 50,000 inpatient admissions for miscarriage occurred in the UK.

== Society and culture ==
Society's reactions to miscarriage have changed over time. In the early 20th century, the focus was on the mother's physical health and the difficulties and disabilities that miscarriage could produce. Other reactions, such as the expense of medical treatments and relief at ending an unwanted pregnancy, were also heard. In the 1940s and 1950s, people were more likely to express relief, not because the miscarriage ended an unwanted or mistimed pregnancy, but because people believed that miscarriages were primarily caused by birth defects, and miscarrying meant that the family would not raise a child with disabilities. The dominant attitude in the mid-century was that a miscarriage, although temporarily distressing, was a blessing in disguise for the family and that another pregnancy and a healthier baby would soon follow, especially if women trusted physicians and reduced their anxieties. Media articles were illustrated with pictures of babies, and magazine articles about miscarriage ended by introducing the healthy baby—usually a boy—that shortly followed it.

Beginning in the 1980s, miscarriage in the US was primarily framed in terms of the individual woman's emotional reaction, especially her grief over a tragic outcome. The subject was portrayed in the media with images of an empty crib or an isolated, grieving woman, and stories about miscarriage were published in general-interest media outlets, not just women's magazines or health magazines. Family members were encouraged to grieve, to memorialize their losses through funerals and other rituals, and to think of themselves as parents. This shift to recognizing these emotional responses was partly due to medical and political successes, which created an expectation that pregnancies are typically planned and safe, and to women's demands that their emotional reactions no longer be dismissed by the medical establishments. It also reinforces the anti-abortion movement's belief that human life begins at conception or early in pregnancy, and that motherhood is a desirable life goal. The modern one-size-fits-all model of grief does not fit every woman's experience, and an expectation to perform grief creates unnecessary burdens for some women. The reframing of miscarriage as a private emotional experience brought less awareness of miscarriage and a sense of silence around the subject, especially compared to the public discussion of miscarriage during campaigns for access to birth control during the early 20th century, or the public campaigns to prevent miscarriages, stillbirths, and infant deaths by reducing industrial pollution during the 1970s.

In places where induced abortion is illegal or carries a social stigma, suspicion may surround miscarriage, complicating an already sensitive issue.

Developments in ultrasound technology (in the early 1980s) allowed them to identify earlier miscarriages.

=== Legal registration ===
Miscarriages may be tracked for purposes of health statistics, but they are not usually recorded individually. For example, under UK law, all stillbirths should be registered, although this does not apply to miscarriages. According to French statutes, an infant born before the age of viability, determined to be 28 weeks, is not registered as a 'child'. If birth occurs after this, the infant is granted a certificate that allows the parents to have a symbolic record of that child. This certificate can include a registered and given name to allow a funeral and acknowledgement of the event.

== Other animals ==
Spontaneous abortion is known from multiple species of non-hominid placental mammal and other vertebrates with convergent embryonic development, such as elasmobranch fishes. There are a variety of known risk factors; for example, in sheep, miscarriage may be caused by crowding through doors or being chased by dogs. In cows, spontaneous abortion may be caused by contagious diseases, such as brucellosis or Campylobacter, but often can be controlled by vaccination. In many species of sharks and rays, stress-induced miscarriage occurs frequently on capture.

Other diseases and risks are also known to make animals susceptible to miscarriage. Spontaneous abortion occurs in pregnant prairie voles when their mate is removed and they are exposed to a new male, an example of the Bruce effect, although this effect is seen less in wild populations than in the laboratory. Female mice who had spontaneous abortions showed a sharp rise in the amount of time spent with unfamiliar males preceding the abortion than those who did not.

== See also ==
- Pregnancy and Infant Loss Remembrance Day
- Perinatal bereavement
- Reproductive loss
- Embryo resorption
- Fetal resorption

== General and cited references ==
- Hoffman B, J. Whitridge Williams (2012). Williams Gynecology (2nd ed.). New York: McGraw-Hill Medical. ISBN 978-0-07-171672-7.
