= Uterine malformation =

Female birth defect in which the uterus forms abnormally

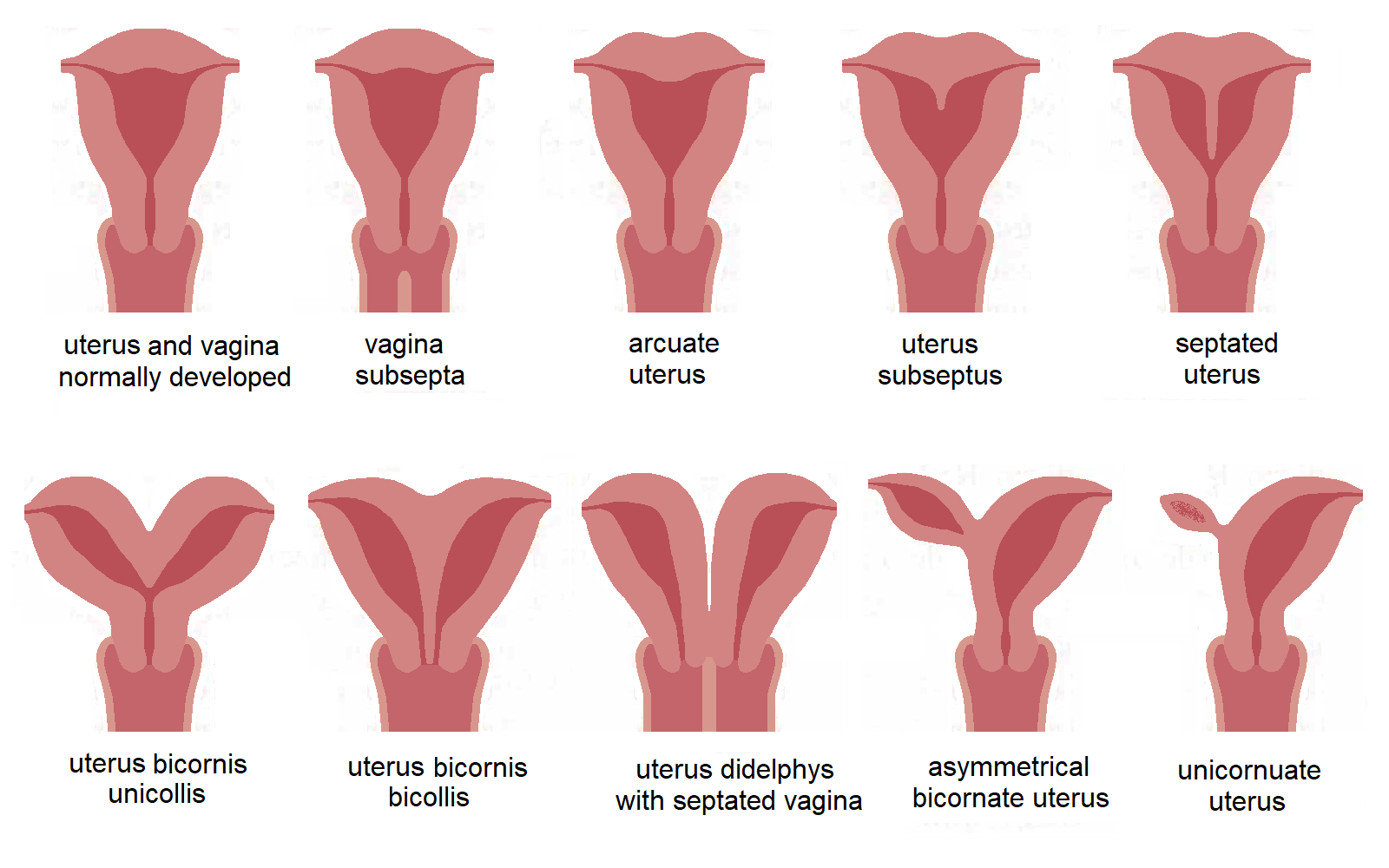
- Malformations of the uterus in humans
- Specialty: Gynecology, obstetrics

A uterine malformation is a type of female genital malformation resulting from an abnormal development of the Müllerian duct(s) during embryogenesis. Symptoms range from amenorrhea, infertility, recurrent pregnancy loss, and pain, to normal functioning depending on the nature of the defect.

== Types ==
The American Fertility Society (now American Society of Reproductive Medicine) Classification distinguishes:

Class I—Müllerian agenesis (absent uterus).
This condition is represented by the hypoplasia or the agenesis (total absence) of the different parts of the uterus:
- Vaginal hypoplasia or agenesis
- Cervical hypoplasia or agenesis
- Fundal hypoplasia or agenesis (absence or hypoplasia of the fundus of the uterus)
- Tubal hypoplasia or agenesis (absence or hypoplasia of the fallopian tubes)
- Combined hypoplasia the agenesis of different part of the uterus
This condition is also called Mayer-Rokitansky-Kuster-Hauser syndrome. The patient with MRKH syndrome will have primary amenorrhea.
Class II—Unicornuate uterus (a one-sided uterus).
Rare condition in which a partial or complete lack of one Müllerian duct is present. The uterus has a typical "banana shape" on imaging systems. This condition can be sub-classified in:
- Communicating: a rudimentary uterine horn is formed and it presents a cavity that communicates with the body of the uterus
- Non-communicating: a rudimentary uterine horn is formed and it presents a cavity that does not communicate with the body of the uterus
- No cavity: a rudimentary uterine horn is present without any cavity
- No horn: there is no rudimentary uterine horn, just the functioning one is present
Class III—Uterus didelphys, also uterus didelphis (double uterus).
Both Müllerian ducts develop but fail to fuse, thus the patient has a "double uterus". This may be a condition with a double cervix and a vaginal partition (see below), or the lower Müllerian system fused into its unpaired condition. See Triplet-birth with Uterus didelphys for a case of a woman having spontaneous birth in both wombs with twins.
Class IV—Bicornuate uterus (uterus with two horns).
Only the upper part of that part of the Müllerian system that forms the uterus fails to fuse, thus the caudal part of the uterus is normal, the cranial part is bifurcated. The uterus is "heart-shaped". This condition can be complete or partial.
Class V—Septated uterus (uterine septum or partition).
The two Müllerian ducts have fused, but the partition between them is still present, splitting the system into two parts. With a complete septum the vagina, cervix and the uterus can be partitioned. Usually the septum affects only the cranial part of the uterus. A uterine septum is the most common uterine malformation and a cause for miscarriages. It is diagnosed by medical image techniques, i.e. ultrasound or an MRI. MRI is considered the preferred modality due to its multiplanar capabilities as well as its ability to evaluate the uterine contour, junctional zone, and other pelvic anatomy. A hysterosalpingogram is not considered as useful due to the inability of the technique to evaluate the exterior contour of the uterus and distinguish between a bicornuate and septate uterus. This condition can be complete or partial
A uterine septum can be corrected by hysteroscopic surgery.
Class VI—DES uterus.

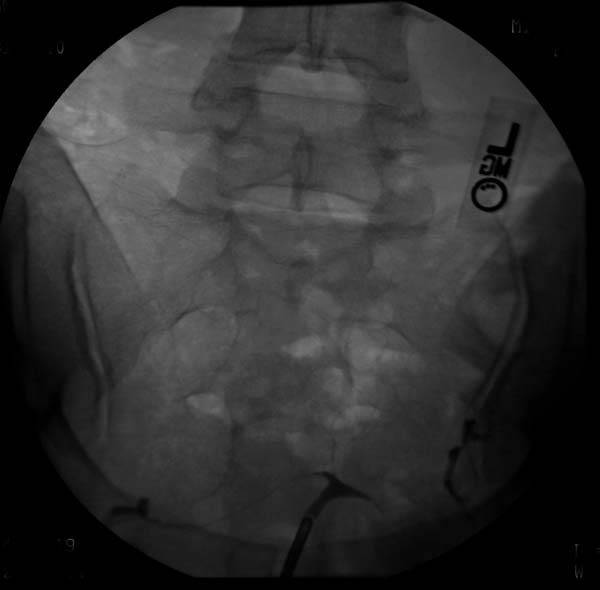
Hysterosalpingography of a T-shaped uterus

The uterine cavity has a "T-shape" as a result of fetal exposure to diethylstilbestrol.

An additional variation is the arcuate uterus where there is a concave dimple in the uterine fundus within the cavity. The distinction between an arcuate uterus and a septate uterus is not standardized.

A rudimentary uterus is a uterine remnant not connected to cervix and vagina and may be found on the other side of a unicornuate uterus.

Patients with uterine abnormalities may have associated renal abnormalities including unilateral renal agenesis.

=== "Double vagina" ===
As the vagina is largely derived from the Müllerian ducts, lack of fusion of the two ducts can lead to the formation of a vaginal duplication and lack of absorption of the wall between the two ducts will leave a residual septum, leading to a "double vagina". This condition may be associated with a uterus didelphys or a uterine septum.

== Diagnosis ==
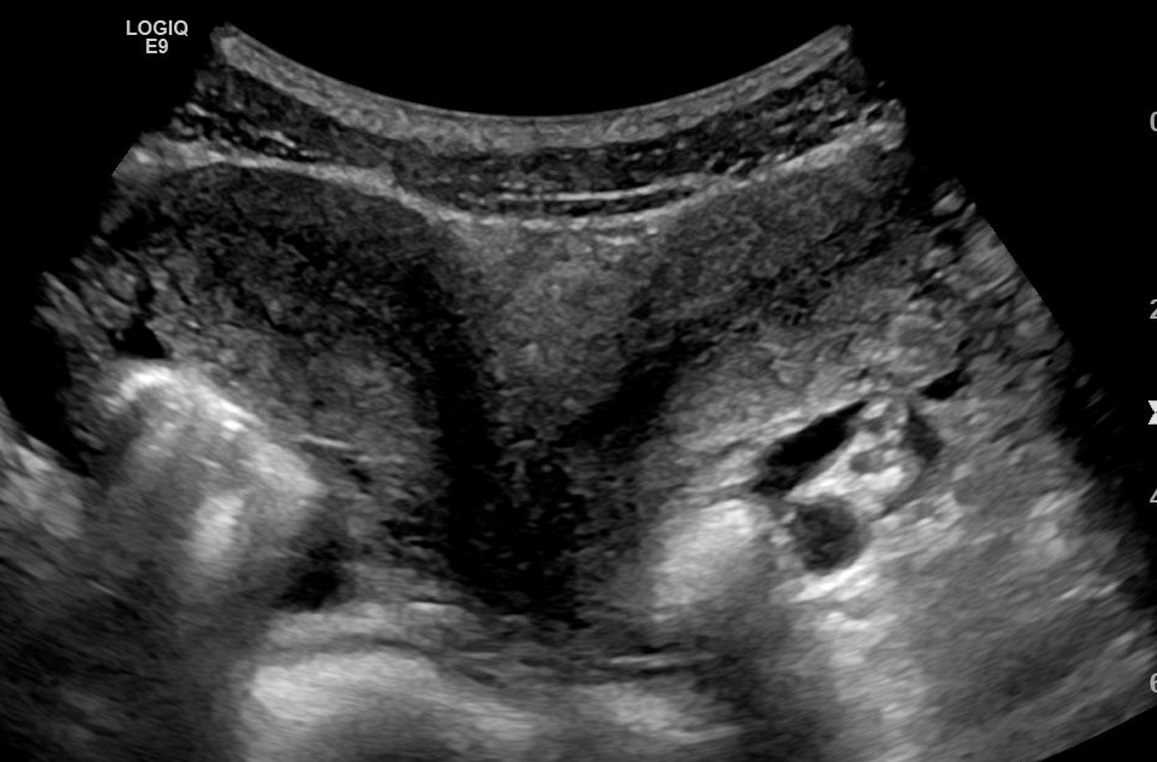
Uterus didelphys seen on ultrasonography

Besides a physical examination, the physician will need imaging techniques to determine the character of the malformation: gynecologic ultrasonography, pelvic MRI, or hysterosalpingography. A hysterosalpingogram is not considered as useful due to the inability of the technique to evaluate the exterior contour of the uterus and distinguish between a bicornuate and septate uterus. In addition, laparoscopy and/or hysteroscopy may be indicated. In some patients the vaginal development may be affected.

== Treatment ==
Surgical intervention depends on the extent of the individual problem. With a didelphic uterus surgery is not usually recommended. A uterine septum can be resected in a simple out-patient procedure that combines laparoscopy and hysteroscopy. This procedure greatly decreases the rate of miscarriage for women with this anomaly.

== Prevalence ==
The prevalence of uterine malformation is estimated to be 6.7% in the general population, slightly higher (7.3%) in the infertility population, and significantly higher in a population of women with a history of recurrent miscarriages (16%).

== See also ==
- Uterus § Other animals – where some malformations in humans are "normal"
