= Arcuate uterus =

Concave variant of uterine cavity shape

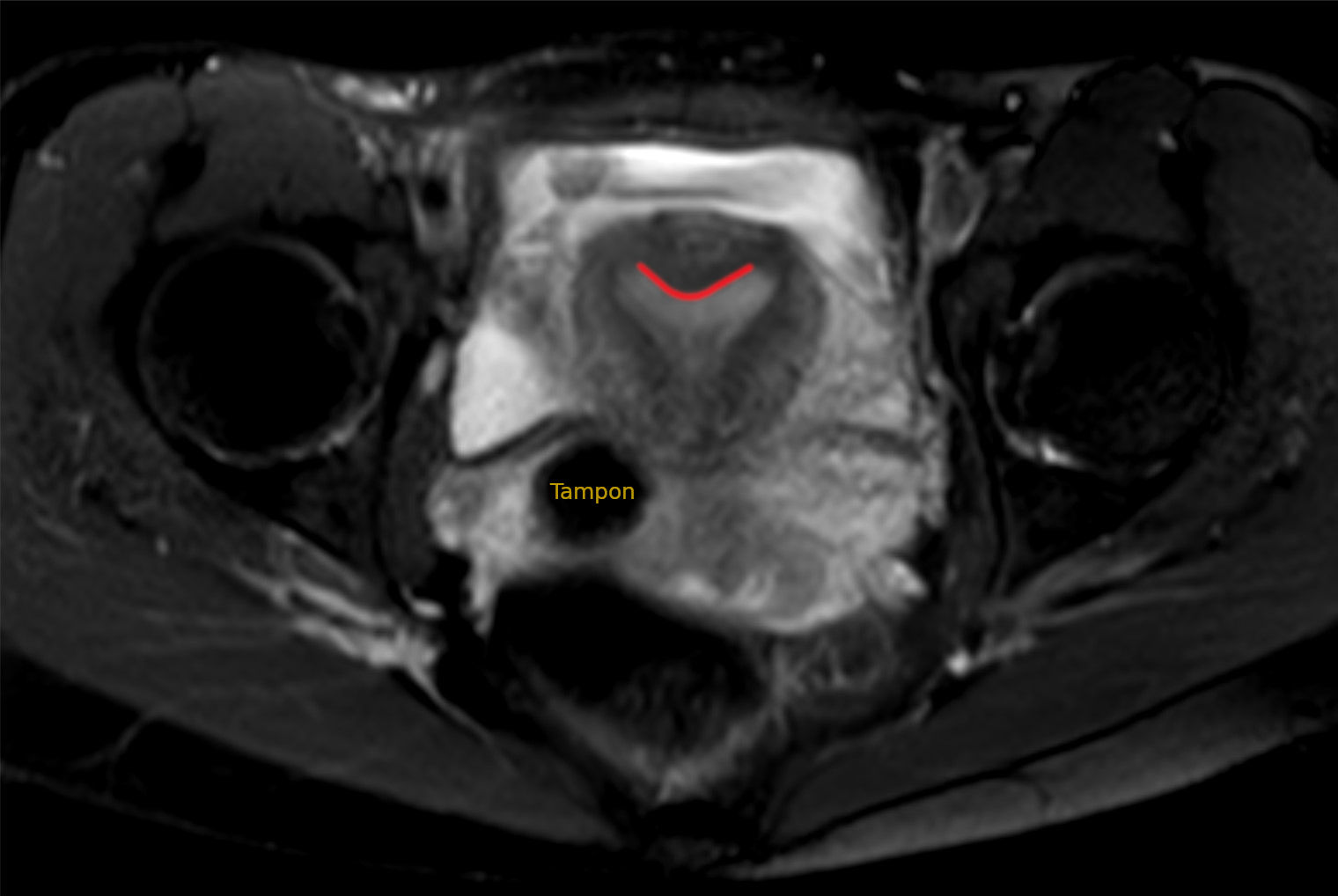
- Arcuate uterus (marked in red) seen on MRI
- Specialty: Gynecology

The arcuate uterus is a form of a uterine anomaly or variation where the uterine cavity displays a concave contour towards the fundus. Normally the uterine cavity is straight or convex towards the fundus on anterior-posterior imaging, but in the arcuate uterus the myometrium of the fundus dips into the cavity and may form a small septation. The distinction between an arcuate uterus and a septate uterus is not standardized.

== Signs and symptoms ==
The arcuate uterus may not be known to the affected individual and does not necessarily result in reproductive problems, allowing for normal pregnancies to occur. There is no consensus on the relationship between the arcuate uterus and recurrent pregnancy loss. The condition may be a variation or a pathology.

One view maintains that the condition is associated with a higher risk for miscarriage, premature birth, and malpresentation. Thus a study that evaluated women with uterine bleeding by hysteroscopy found that 6.5% of subjects displayed the arcuate uterus and had evidence of reproductive impairments. A study based on hysterosalpingraphic detected arcuate lesions documented increased fetal loss and obstetrical complications as a risk for affected women. Woelfer found that the miscarriage risk is more pronounced in the second trimester. In contrast, a study utilizing 3-D ultrasonography to document the prevalence of the arcuate uterus in a gynecological population found no evidence of increased risk of reproductive loss; in this study 3.1% of women had an arcuate uterus making it the most common uterine anomaly; this prevalence was similar than in women undergoing sterilization and lower than in women with recurrent pregnancy loss.

== Cause ==
The uterus is formed during embryogenesis by the fusion of the two Müllerian ducts. During this fusion a resorption process eliminates the partition between the two ducts to create a single cavity. This process begins caudally and advances cranially, thus an arcuate uterus represents an incomplete absorption process in the final stage.

== Diagnosis ==
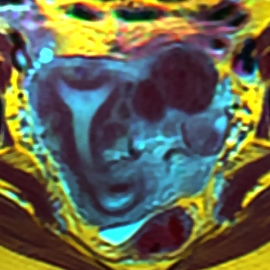
Arcuate uterus with fibroids seen on MRI

A transvaginal ultrasound can reveal the condition.

Helpful techniques to investigate the uterine structure are transvaginal ultrasonography and sonohysterography, hysterosalpingography, MRI, and hysteroscopy. More recently 3-D ultrasonography has been advocated as an excellent non-invasive method to delineate the condition.

=== Differential diagnosis ===
The major differential diagnosis is the uterine septum. The lack of agreement to separate these two entities makes it difficult to assess the results in the literature.

== Management ==
Many patients with an arcuate uterus will not experience any reproductive problems and do not require any surgery. In patients with recurrent pregnancy loss thought to be caused by an arcuate uterus hysteroscopic resection can be performed.

== Epidemiology ==
Most studies of uterine malformations are based on populations of women who have experienced a miscarriage and thus do not address the issue of the prevalence in the general population. A screening study by Woelfer et al. of women without a history of reproductive problems found that about 5% of women had an arcuate uterus when they defined an arcuate uterus any fundal protrusion into the cavity that had an apical angle of more than 90 degrees. Accordingly, it was the most common uterine anomaly, followed by septate uterus (3%) and bicornuate uterus (0.5%).
