= Uterine septum =

Congenital condition of the uterus

- Specialty: Gynaecology

A uterine septum is a congenital uterine malformation where the uterine cavity is partitioned by a longitudinal septum; the outside of the uterus has a normal typical shape. The wedge-like partition may involve only the superior part of the cavity resulting in an incomplete septum or a subseptate uterus, or less frequently the total length of the cavity (complete septum) and the cervix resulting in a double cervix. The septation may also continue caudally into the vagina resulting in a "double vagina".

== Signs and symptoms ==
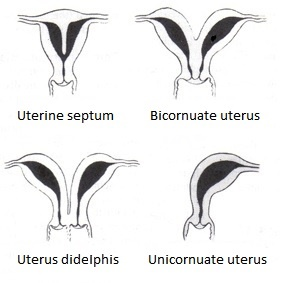
Four types of uterine malformations

The condition may not be known to the affected individual and not result in any reproductive problems; thus normal pregnancies may occur. In more serious cases have reported high infertility rates. However, it is associated with a higher risk for miscarriage, premature birth, and malpresentation. According to the classical study by Buttram there is a 60% risk of a spontaneous abortion, this being more common in the second than in the first trimester. However, there is no agreement on this number and other studies show a lower risk. Woelfer found that the miscarriage risk is more pronounced in the first trimester.

The condition is also associated with abnormalities of the renal system. Further, skeletal abnormalities have been linked to the condition.

== Cause ==
The uterus is formed during embryogenesis by the fusion of the two Müllerian ducts. During this fusion a resorption process eliminates the partition between the two ducts to create a single cavity. This process begins caudally and advances cranially, thus a complete septum formation represents an earlier disturbance of this absorption than the incomplete form. Causes for incomplete absorption are not known.

== Diagnosis ==
A pelvic examination may reveal a double vagina or double cervix that should be further investigated and may lead to the discovery of a uterine septum. In most patients, however, the pelvic examination is normal. Investigations are usually prompted on the basis of reproductive problems.

Helpful techniques to investigate a septum are transvaginal ultrasonography and sonohysterography, MRI, and hysteroscopy. More recently 3-D ultrasonography has been advocated as an excellent non-invasive method to delineate the condition. Prior to modern imaging hysterosalpingography was used to help diagnose the uterine septum, however, a bicornuate uterus may deliver a similar image. An important category of septate uterus is the hybrid type a variant that may be misdiagnosed as bicornuate uterus when seen by laparoscopy Professor El Saman From Egypt was the first to describe this anomaly and warned gynecologist about this common misdiagnosis, whenever there is a uterine fundus depression on laparoscopy gynecologists should compare the depth of this depression with the depth of the dividing internal interface. Hybrid septate uterus benefit from hysteroscopic metroplasty under laparoscopic control.

=== Differential diagnosis ===
Other forms of uterine malformation need to be considered in the work-up for uterine septum. An arcuate uterus contains a residual cranial septum that is smaller than an incomplete septum but definitions between the two conditions are not standardized, - a cause for discrepancies in the literature. A bicornuate uterus is sometimes confused with a septate uterus as in each situation the cavity is partitioned, however, in the former case the uterine body is cranially doubled (two uterine horns) while in the latter a single uterine body is present. The former represents a malformation of incomplete fusion of the Müllerian systems, and the latter of incomplete absorption. A hysterosalpingogram may not be able to distinguish between the two conditions. The differentiation, however, is important as a septum can be corrected by hysteroscopy, while a bicornuate uterus would be corrected by a metroplasty via laparotomy if necessary.

== Management ==
A septum can be resected with surgery. Hysteroscopic removal of a uterine septum is generally the preferred method, as the intervention is relatively minor and safe in experienced hands. A follow-up imaging study should demonstrate the removal of the septum. Tactile cold scissor metroplasty was described as a back technique for hysteroscopic challenges that interfere with proper visualization or uterine distention.

It is not considered necessary to remove a septum that has not caused problems, especially in women who are not considering pregnancy. There is controversy over whether a septum should be removed prophylactically to reduce the risk of pregnancy loss prior to a pregnancy or infertility treatment.

== Epidemiology ==
Most studies are based on populations of women who have experienced a pregnancy loss and thus do not address the issue of the prevalence in the general population. A screening study by Woelfer et al. of women without a history of reproductive problems found that about 3% of women had a uterine septation; the most common anomaly in their study was an arcuate uterus (5%), while 0.5% were found to have a bicornuate uterus. In contrast, in about 15% of patients with recurrent pregnancy loss anatomical problems are thought to be causative with the septate uterus as the most common finding.
