= Bicornuate uterus =

- Other names: bicornate uterus
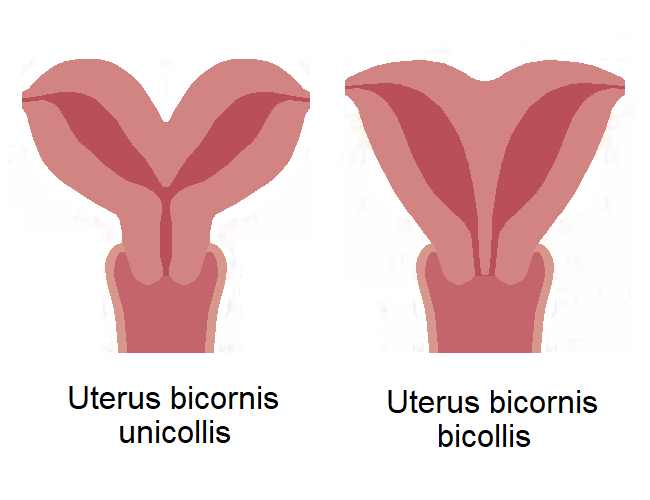
- Two types of a human bicornuate uterus
- Specialty: Gynaecology

A bicornuate uterus, or bicornate uterus (from the Latin cornū, meaning "horn"), is a type of Müllerian anomaly in the human uterus, where there is a deep indentation at the fundus (top) of the uterus.

== Pathophysiology ==
A bicornuate uterus develops during embryogenesis. It occurs when the proximal (upper) portions of the paramesonephric ducts do not fuse, but the distal portions that develops into the lower uterine segment, cervix, and upper vagina fuse normally.

== Diagnosis ==
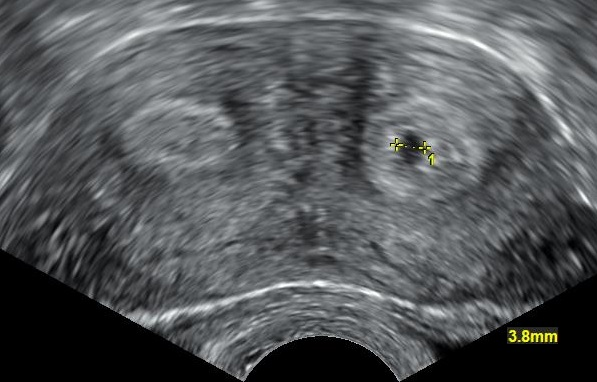
Transvaginal ultrasonography showing a cross-section of a bicornuate uterus, with two cavities (or "horns") to the left and right, respectively. The one to the right contains a gestational sac.

Diagnosis of bicornuate uterus typically involves imaging of the uterus with 2D or 3D ultrasound, hysterosalpingography, or magnetic resonance imaging (MRI). On imaging, a bicornuate uterus can be distinguished from a septate uterus by the angle between the cornua (intercornual angle): less than 75 degrees in a septate uterus, and greater than 105 degrees in a bicornuate uterus. Measuring the depth of the cleft between the cornua (fundal cleft) may also assist in diagnosis; a cleft of over 1 centimetre (0.39 in) is indicative of bicornuate uterus.

=== Classification ===
Bicornuate uterus is typically classified based on whether or not the division extends to the external cervical os. Bicornuate uteri with a division above the os are called bicornuate unicollis and those with a divided os are called bicornuate bicollis. There is a continuous range of the degree and location of the fusion of the paramesonephric ducts, and existence of a spectrum, rather than a fixed number of types corresponding to strict medical definitions. Two processes that occur during the embryonic development of the paramesonephric ducts — fusion and reabsorption — can be affected to different degrees.

There is also a hybrid bicornuate uterus: External fundal depressions of variable depths associated with a septate uterus can be seen by laparoscopy, indicating the coexistence of the two anomalies. These cases are candidates for hysteroscopic metroplasty under appropriate sonographic and/or laparoscopic monitoring.

An obstructed bicornuate uterus showing uni or bilateral obstruction might also be possible. The unilateral obstruction is more difficult to diagnose than the bilateral obstructive. A delay in the diagnosis can be problematic and compromise the reproductive abilities of those cases.

== Treatment ==
Bicornuate uterus typically requires no treatment. In those who do need treatment, metroplasty is the surgical correction of choice. Women who have recurrent miscarriage with no other explanation may benefit from surgery.

== Epidemiology ==
The occurrence of all types of paramesonephric duct abnormalities in women is estimated around 0.4%. A bicornuate uterus occur in 0.4% of the general population.

== In pregnancy ==
A bicornuate uterus is an indication for increased surveillance of a pregnancy, though most women with a bicornuate uterus are able to have healthy pregnancies.

Women with a bicornuate uterus are at an increased risk of recurrent miscarriage, preterm birth, malpresentation, disruptions to fetal growth, premature rupture of membranes, placenta previa and retained placenta (which can lead to postpartum hemorrhage).

This is due to the distortion of the normal shape of the uterus, distortion of the cervix leading to cervical insufficiency, or under-vascularization of the endometrium as the pregnancy requires more blood supply. In some cases, the nonpregnant horn can rupture during labor, necessitating emergency surgery.

Fetuses developing in bicornuate uteri are more likely to present breech or transverse, with the fetal head in one horn and the feet in the other. This will often necessitate cesarean delivery. If the fetus is vertex (head down), the two horns may not contract in coordination, or the horn that does not contain the pregnancy may interfere with contractions and descent of the fetus, causing obstructed labor.

== Effect on intrauterine device usage ==
Usage of intrauterine device (IUD) with copper requires one IUD in each horn to be effective in case of bicornuate uterus. The same practice is generally applied when using IUD with progestogen due to lack of evidence of efficacy with only one IUD. Evidence is lacking regarding progestogen IUD usage for menorrhagia in bicornuate uterus, but a case report showed good effect with a single IUD.

== Uterus bicornis in mammals ==
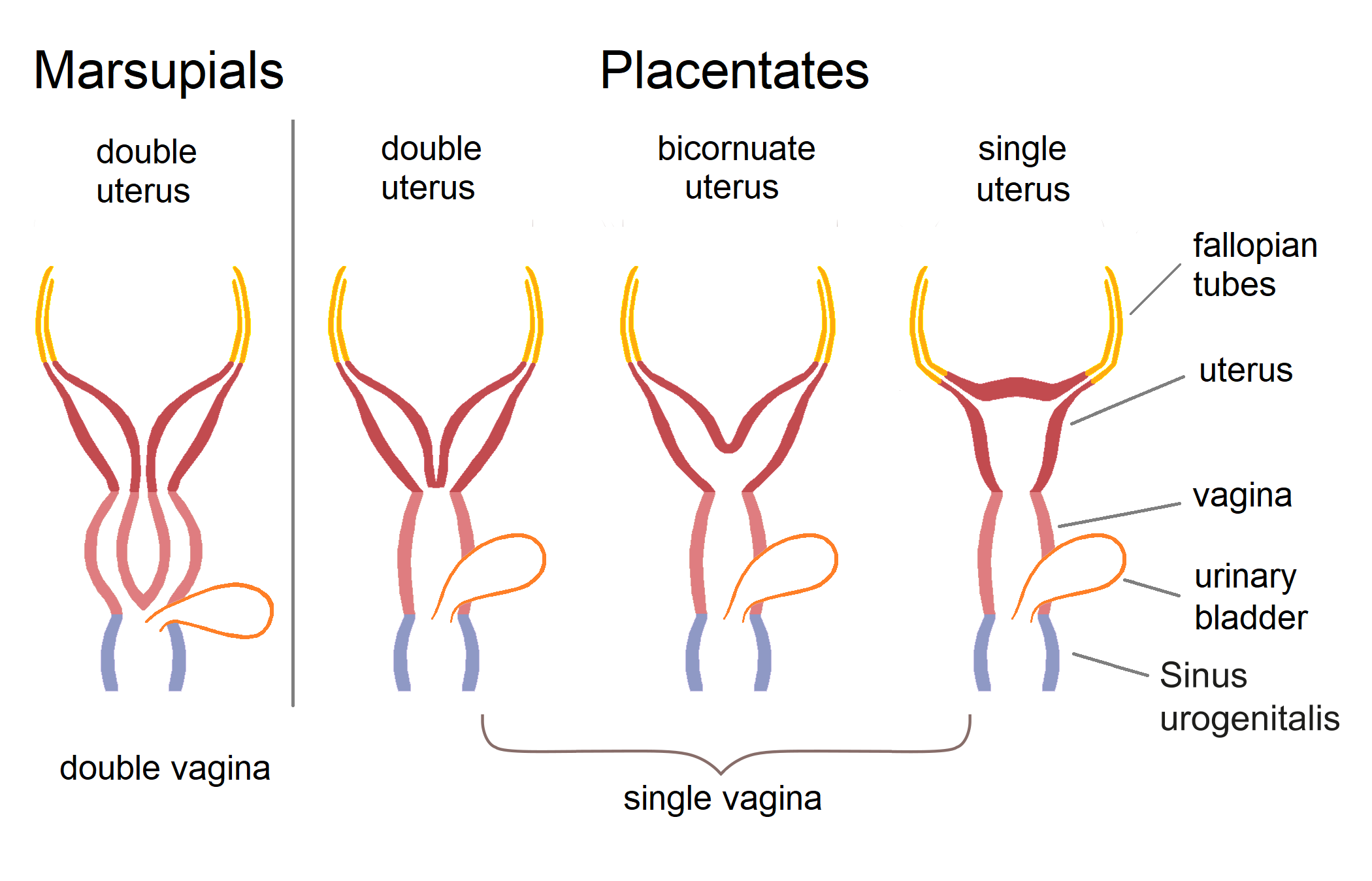

A double uterus is the normal female anatomy in many mammals. In insectivores, certain species of primates i.e. lemurs, furthermore in carnivores, and in whales the uterus bicornis a part of their healthy morphological structures.

== Health issues ==
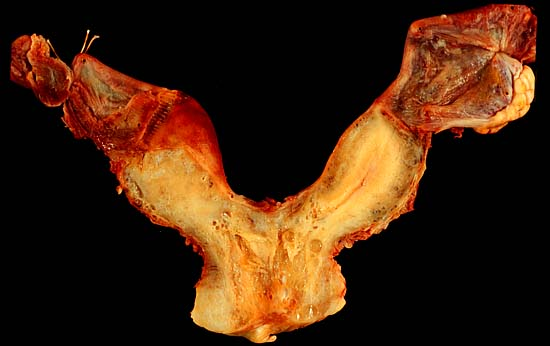
Preparation of a uterus bicornis after removal of the left ovarian tumour and later hysterectomy.

The risk of cancer is not increased in the case of uterus bicornis. Endometrial carcinomas are very rare. If the presence of a uterus bicornis is not yet known and there is clinical suspicion of a carcinoma, which cannot be confirmed by the histological findings, sonography and magnetic resonance imaging provide diagnostic possibilities, as the cause may lie in a second uterine horn. Approximately 15% of all ovarian tumours and 8% to 10% of epithelial ovarian tumours are mucinous cyst adenomas, which can also arise in a normally developed uterus.
