= Reproductive medicine =

Branch of medicine

Aristotle

Reproductive medicine is a branch of medicine concerning the male and female reproductive systems. It encompasses a variety of reproductive conditions, their prevention and assessment, as well as their subsequent treatment and prognosis.

Reproductive medicine has allowed the development of artificial reproductive techniques (ARTs) which have allowed advances in overcoming human infertility, as well as being used in agriculture and in wildlife conservation. Some examples of ARTs include IVF, artificial insemination (AI) and embryo transfer, as well as genome resource banking.

== Scope ==
Reproductive medicine addresses issues of sexual education, puberty, family planning, birth control, infertility, reproductive system disease (including sexually transmitted infections) and sexual dysfunction. In women, reproductive medicine also covers menstruation, ovulation, pregnancy and menopause, as well as gynecologic disorders that affect fertility.

The field cooperates with and overlaps mainly with reproductive endocrinology and infertility, sexual medicine and andrology, but also to some degree with gynecology, obstetrics, urology, genitourinary medicine, medical endocrinology, pediatric endocrinology, genetics, and psychiatry.

== History ==
The study of reproductive medicine is thought to date back to Aristotle, where he came up with the “Haematogenous Reproduction Theory”. However, evidence-based reproductive medicine is traceable back to the 1970s. Since then, there have been many milestones for reproductive medicine, including the birth of Louise Brown, the first baby to be conceived through IVF in 1978. Despite this, it was not until 1989 that it became a clinical discipline thanks to the work of Iain Chalmers in developing the systematic review and the Cochrane collection.

=== History of reproductive medicine in childbirth ===
Long before modern medical practices, midwives have been assisting during childbirth for millennia. Midwives often served one specific region for extended periods of time. Due to their more personal knowledge of the women they served, as well as their knowledge of female anatomy, they were often able to diagnose complications more accurately than contemporary male physicians.By the late nineteenth century, European midwives were sterilizing surgical instruments to prevent infection.These tactics were effective in reducing maternal mortality; historically, women in areas with many midwives were less likely to die in childbirth than women in areas with few midwives.

=== History of contraception ===
The use of the penile sheath can be dated back to ancient Egypt. While the original use for them has not been proven, later sheaths made of linen were described as protection from venereal diseases. Subsequent forms of the condom were made from animal intestines and proved to be a successful form of STD prevention in late 17th century Europe.

The male condom, made of rubber, was available in the 1860's. Before the distribution of the birth control pill, the condom was the most popular form of birth control in United States.

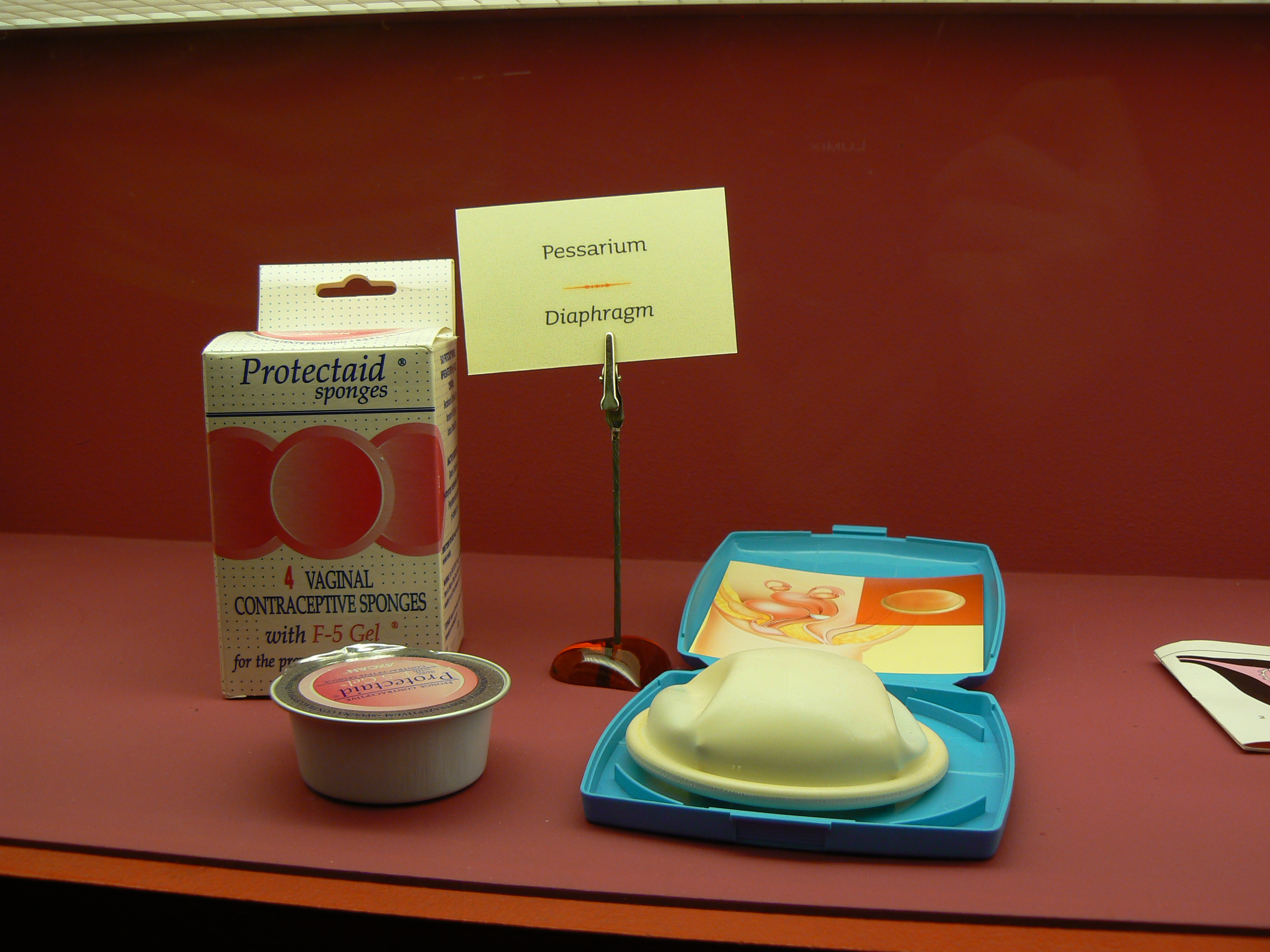
Image of non-hormonal barrier contraceptives such as sponges and diaphragms.

The oral contraceptive pill was introduced in May of 1950. In 1960, The pill was federally approved by the United States and made available for regulation of menstruation. It was not until 1969 that the pill was allowed to be legally prescribed for contraception. Before the birth control pill, women used other forms of contraception such as suppositories, douches, and diaphragms.

The first trial of the birth control pill on a large scale was done in Puerto Rico in 1956. Over 200 women tested the product and reported side effects such as blood clots and nausea. By 1967, these side effects as well as safety were being addressed. Today, the hormone doses in birth control pills are lower, and the ingredients, such as progestin and estrogen, are more pharmacologically specific. In addition to preventing pregnancy, hormonal contraception can offer benefits like decreased acne, decrease in pregnancy related deaths, and reduced risk of death from ovarian and endometrial cancers.

=== Political reform ===
Birth control is integrated with female culture as well as politics. In the 20th century, women scientists and radical activists lead the movement on reproductive freedom and family planning with the birth control movement. These women sought to distribute information on contraception in an era where their ideas were seen as radical and controversial. The birth control pill, seen as taboo was marketed as "cycle control" upon its initial release. The Comstock Law, established in 1873, made the discussion and research of contraception illegal in the United States.

== Conditions ==
Reproductive medicine deals with prevention, diagnosis and management of the following conditions. This section will give examples of a number of common conditions affecting the human reproductive system.

=== Infectious diseases ===
Reproductive tract infections (RTIs) are infections that affect the reproductive tract. There are three types of RTIs: endogenous RTIs, iatrogenic RTIs and sexually transmitted infections. Endogenous RTIs are caused by an overgrowth of bacteria which is normally present. An example of an endogenous RTI is bacterial vaginosis.

Iatrogenic RTIs are infections contracted as a result of a medical procedure.

Sexually transmitted infections (STIs) are infections spread by sexual activity, usually by vaginal intercourse, anal sex, oral sex, and rarely manual sex. Many STIs are curable; however, some STIs such as HIV are incurable. STIs can be bacterial, viral or fungal and affect both men and women. Some examples of STIs are listed below:

- Bacterial STIs
  - Chlamydia
  - Gonorrhoea
  - Syphilis
- Viral STIs
  - Herpes
  - Human Papilloma Virus (HPV)
  - Human Immunodeficiency Virus (HIV)

=== Cancer ===
Many parts of the Reproductive system can be affected by cancer. Below are some examples of Reproductive cancers:

==== Reproductive cancers affecting women ====
- Breast cancer
- Ovarian cancer
- Uterine cancer
- Cervical cancer

==== Reproductive cancers affecting men ====
- Prostate cancer
- Penile cancer
- Testicular cancer
- Male breast cancer
- Benign prostatic hyperplasia

=== Conditions affecting fertility ===
A significant part of reproductive medicine involves promoting fertility in both men and women.

==== Causes of infertility or subfertility in women ====
- Ovulatory dysfunction
  - Polyendocrine metabolic ovarian syndrome (PMOS)
  - Hypergonadotropic hypogonadism
  - Hypogonadotropic hypogonadism
- Tubular dysfunction
  - Pelvic inflammatory disease
  - Endometriosis
  - Previous sterilisation
  - Previous surgery
- Cervical or uterine dysfunction
  - Congenital abnormalities
  - Fibroids
  - Asherman's syndrome
- Hormonal issues
  - Hypothyroidism
  - Hyperthyroidism
  - Cushing's syndrome
  - Congenital adrenal hyperplasia

==== Causes of infertility or subfertility in men ====
- Problems with sperm number or function
  - Cryptorchidism
  - Y chromosome micro-deletions
  - Varicocele
  - Hypogonadotropic hypogonadism
  - Hypergonadotropic hypogonadism
- Tubular dysfunction
  - Congenital abnormalities
  - Prior sexually transmitted infections
  - Vasectomy
- Problems with sperm delivery
  - Premature ejaculation
  - Damage to the reproductive organs
  - Retrograde ejaculation
  - Certain genetic diseases

=== Congenital abnormalities ===
==== Congenital abnormalities of the female reproductive system ====
- Cervical abnormalities
  - Cervical agenesis
  - Cervical duplication
- Hymen abnormalities
  - Imperforate hymen
  - Microperforate hymen
  - Septate hymen
- Uterine abnormalities
  - Duplicate uterus
  - Unicornate uterus
  - Septate uterus
- Vaginal abnormalities
  - Transverse vaginal septum
  - Vertical vaginal septum
  - Vaginal agenesis
  - Mayer-Rokitansky-Küster-Hauser syndrome
- Vulvar abnormalities
  - Labial hypoplasia
  - Labial hypertrophy

==== Congenital abnormalities of the male reproductive system ====
- Cryptorchidism
- Hypospadias
- Epispadias

=== Endocrine Disorders ===
==== Disorders due to hormone excess ====
- Polyendocrine metabolic ovarian syndrome (PMOS)
- Granulosa cell tumour
- Leydig cell tumour
- Teratoma

==== Disorders due to hormone deficiency ====
- Hypogonadism
- Turner's syndrome
- Klinefelter's syndrome

==== Disorders due to hormone hypersensitivity ====
- Idiopathic hirsutism

==== Disorders due to hormone resistance ====
- Androgen insensitivity syndrome
- 5a-reductase deficiency

==== Non-functioning endocrine tumours ====
- Ovarian cysts
- Carcinoma
- Teratoma
- Seminoma

==== Secondary endocrine disorders (originating in the pituitary gland) ====
- Pituitary gonadotrophinoma
- Hypopituitarism
- Kallmann's syndrome

== Assessment and treatment ==
Assessment and treatment of reproductive conditions is a key area of reproductive medicine.

Female assessment starts with a full medical history (anamnesis) which provides details of the woman's general health, sexual history and relevant family history. A physical examination will also take place to identify abnormalities such as hirsutism, abdominal masses, infection, cysts or fibroids. A blood test can inform the clinician of the endocrine status of the patient. Progesterone levels are measured to check for ovulation, and other ovulatory hormones can also be measured. Imaging techniques such as pelvic ultrasounds can also be used to assess the internal anatomy.

Male assessment also starts with a history and physical examination to look for any visible abnormalities. Investigations of semen samples also take place to assess the volume, motility and number of sperm, as well as identifying infections.

Once the investigations are complete, treatment of identified conditions can occur. For fertility issues, this may involve assisted reproductive technology (ART) such as in-vitro fertilisation (IVF) or fertility medication. There are surgical methods that can be used as treatment however these are now performed less frequently due to the increasing success of the less invasive techniques. Treatment is also required for sexually transmitted infections (STIs). These can take the form of antibiotics for bacterial infections such as chlamydia or highly active anti-retroviral therapy (HAART) for the HIV virus.

== Education and training ==
Before starting a career in reproductive medicine, individuals must first obtain an undergraduate degree. The next step is medical school, where they earn a Doctor of Medicine (MD) or Doctor of Osteopathic Medicine (DO) degree. Specialists in reproductive medicine usually undergo medical residency training in obstetrics and gynecology followed by medical fellowship training in reproductive endocrinology and infertility. An alternative path to practicing reproductive medicine after medical school involves a medical residency in urology, followed by a medical fellowship in male infertility. The education and training required to practice reproductive medicine is typically 15-16 years in duration. After completing medical fellowship, physicians can obtain board certification and must maintain continuing medical education (CME). CME is necessary in reproductive medicine as advancements in technology and treatment options require ongoing learning and skill development.

For reproductive medicine specialists in contraception, other methods of training are possible. Specialists tend to be organized in specialty organizations such as the American Society for Reproductive Medicine (ASRM) and European Society of Human Reproduction and Embryology (ESHRE).

== Anamnesis ==
The anamnesis or medical history taking of issues related to reproductive or sexual medicine may be inhibited by a person's reluctance to disclose intimate or uncomfortable information. Even if such an issue is on the person's mind, they often do not start talking about such an issue without the physician initiating the subject by a specific question about sexual or reproductive health. Some familiarity with the doctor generally makes it easier for person to talk about intimate issues such as sexual subjects, but for some people, a very high degree of familiarity may make the person reluctant to reveal such intimate issues. When visiting a health provider about sexual issues, having both partners of a couple present is often necessary, and is typically a good thing, but may also prevent the disclosure of certain subjects, and, according to one report, increases the stress level.

== Ethical and medicolegal issues ==
There are many ethical and legal issues surrounding reproductive medicine. In the UK the Human Fertilisation and Embryology Authority (HEFA) regulates many aspects of reproductive medicine in the UK, including IVF, Artificial Insemination, storage of reproductive tissue and research in this field. HEFA was established due to the Human Fertilisation and Embryology Act (1990). This act was reviewed and the Human Fertilisation and Embryology Act (2008) was passed through parliament as an update to the 1990 act.

For therapies such as IVF, many countries have strict guidelines. In the UK, referrals are only given to women under 40 who have either undergone 12 cycles of artificial insemination, or have tried and failed to conceive for 2 years. While NICE recommends NHS clinical commissioning groups (CCGs) to provide 3 NHS funded cycles of IVF, many only offer 1 cycle, with some only offering IVF in exceptional circumstances on the NHS. If an individual does not meet the criteria or has gone through the maximum number of NHS-funded cycles, the individual will have to pay for private treatment

Many reproductive technologies are seen to have ethical problems, including IVF, mitochondrial replacement therapy, germline modification, preimplantation genetic diagnosis.

There are many groups around the world which oppose to ARTs, including religious groups and pro-life charities such as LIFE.

== Literature ==
- Lipshultz LI, Khera M, Atwal DT. Urology and the Primary Care Practitioner. Philadelphia: Elsevier, 2008.
- Naomi Pfeffer: The Stork and the Syringe: A Political History of Reproductive Medicine (Feminist Perspectives) Polity Press 1993, ISBN 0-7456-1187-7
- Speroff L, Glass RH, Kase NG. Clinical Gynecologic Endocrinology and Infertility. Fifth Edition. Williams and Wilkins, Baltimore MD, 1994 ISBN 0-683-07899-2
