= Vaginal anomalies =

Congenital defect; abnormal or absent vagina

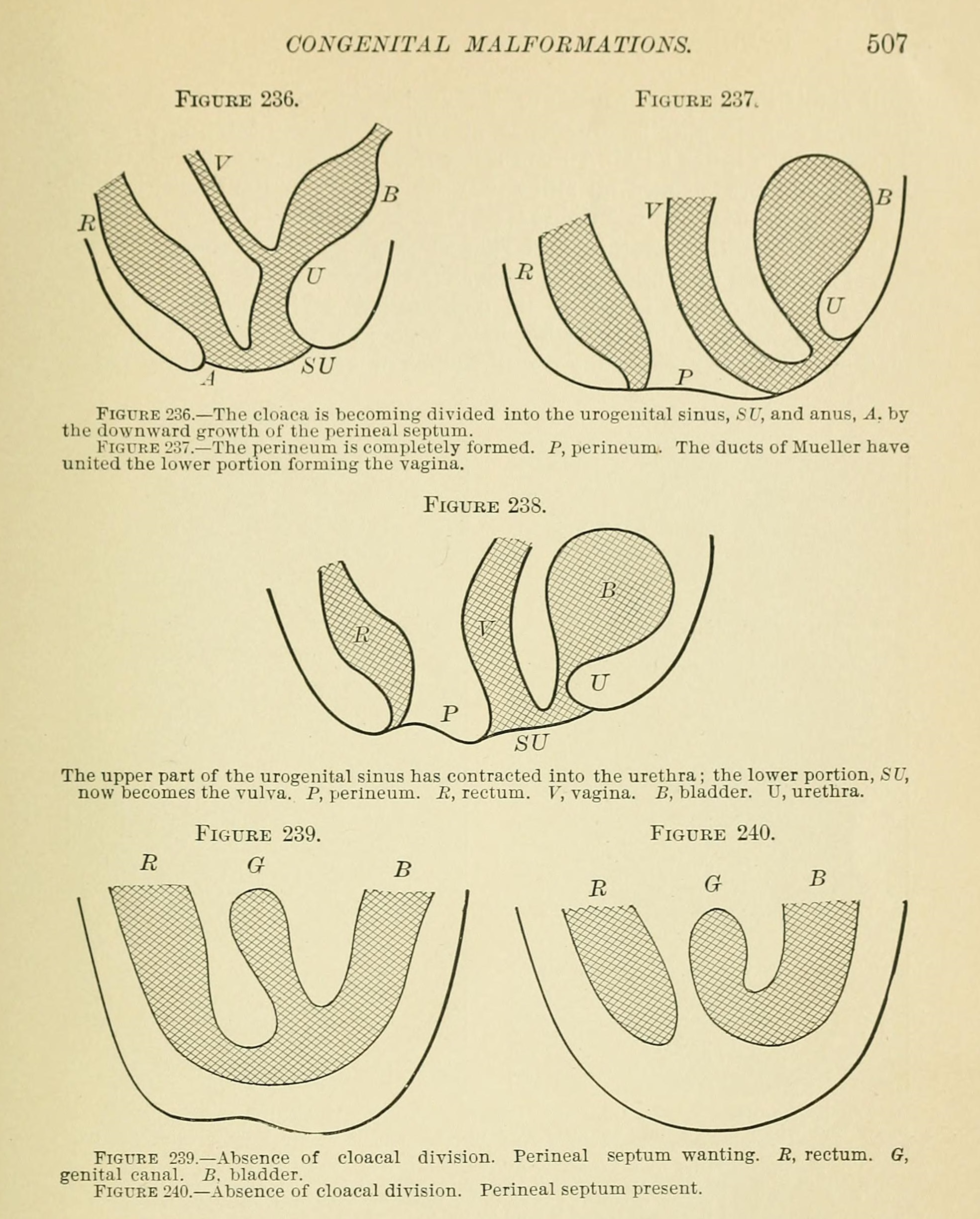
A 1904 gynecology textbook that describes some vaginal anomalies

Vaginal anomalies are abnormal structures that are formed (or not formed) during the prenatal development of the female reproductive system and are rare congenital defects that result in an abnormal or absent vagina.

When present, they are often found with uterine, skeletal and urinary abnormalities. This is because these structures, like the vagina, are most susceptible to disruption during crucial times of organ-genesis. Many of these defects are classified under the broader term Müllerian duct anomalies. Müllerian duct anomalies are caused by a disturbance during the embryonic time of genitourinary development.

The other isolated incidents of vaginal anomalies can occur with no apparent cause. Oftentimes vaginal anomalies are part of a cluster of defects or syndromes. In addition, inheritance can play a part as can prenatal exposure to some teratogens. Many vaginal anomalies are not detected at birth because the external genitalia appear to be normal. Other organs of the reproductive system may not be affected by an abnormality of the vagina. The uterus, fallopian tubes and ovaries can be functional despite the presence of a defect of the vagina and external genitalia.

A vaginal anomaly may not affect fertility. Though it depends on the extent of the vaginal defect, it is possible for conception to occur. In instances where a functional ovary exists, IVF may be successful. Functioning ovaries in a woman with a vaginal defect allows the implantation of a fertilized ovum into the uterus of an unaffected gestational carrier, usually another human.

Vaginal length varies from 6.5 to 12.5 cm. Since this is slightly shorter than older descriptions, it may impact the diagnosis of women with vaginal agenesis or hypoplasia who may unnecessarily be encouraged to undergo treatment to increase the size of the vagina.

Vaginal anomalies may cause difficulties in urination, conception, pregnancy, or impair sex. Psychosocial effects can also exist.

== Signs and symptoms ==
=== Isolated anomalies ===
Some anomalies are found upon examination shortly after birth or when the development of sexual characteristics does not progress as expected. Defects that prevent menstrual flow become obvious when amenorrhea occurs.

=== Syndromes ===
Syndromes may take longer to identify since they are rare and often involve errors in metabolism. Many syndromes share the same signs and symptoms.

=== Associated uterine defects ===
Uterine defects can accompany vaginal abnormalities:

- Müllerian agenesis (absent uterus). Uterus is not present, vagina only rudimentary or absent.
- Uterus didelphys, also uterus didelphis (double uterus). transverse vaginal septum
- Septated uterus (uterine septum or partition). With a complete vaginal septum.
- Rudimentary uterus is a uterine remnant not connected to cervix and vagina.

Women with uterine abnormalities may have associated renal abnormalities including unilateral renal agenesis.

=== Anomalies associated with syndromes ===
Some congenital syndromes present with vaginal anomalies in association with other serious conditions. These include Fraser syndrome, WNT4 deficiency, and Bardet-Biedl syndrome, Isolated incidents of vaginal anomalies can occur with no apparent cause and in other instances these anomalies are part of a syndrome or cluster of other abnormalities. The origin of many vaginal anomalies is due to a disturbance during the embryonic stage of genitourinary development. Inheritance can play a part as can prenatal exposure to hormones and teratogens. Though the presence of a vaginal anomaly does not necessarily prevent conception and a successful pregnancy when a functional uterus and ovaries are present, vaginal anomalies increase the risk of miscarriage.

Syndrome	Acronyms	References
Fraser syndrome		
WNT4 deficiency		
Bardet–Biedl syndrome		
McKusick–Kaufman syndrome		
Herlyn–Werner–Wunderlich syndrome	HWW, OHVIRA	
Congenital adrenal hyperplasia		
Mullerian anomalies		
Müllerian agenesis		
Congenital adrenal hyperplasia		
OEIS complex		
Exstrophy–epispadias complex		

Prenatal exposure to some hormones can cause vaginal anomalies as can the lack of necessary hormones needed for normal development. Diethylstilbestrol (DES), also known formerly (and inappropriately) as stilboestrol, is a synthetic nonsteroidal estrogen and teratogen that can cause vaginal abnormalities in the developing embryo.

== Cause ==
The cause of isolated cases of vaginal anomalies can not always be identified, though disruption of the embryonic development of the vagina likely plays a significant role.

== Diagnosis ==
Imaging studies are usually the most useful in diagnosing vaginal anomalies including retrograde contrast studies. An anomaly scan can be helpful, especially detecting the presence of a urogenital syndrome. Genetic and metabolic defects require further testing to support a diagnosis .

== Treatment ==
Vaginal anomalies are treated surgically. A 'neo-vagina' can be constructed for those girls and women who do not have a vagina. Vaginal septa are treated surgically.

The most common vaginal anomaly is an imperforate hymen. This anomaly occurs often enough that it can be detected by some pediatricians shortly after birth. It can be corrected through a minor surgery and may be delayed until puberty. The hymen can be unusually thick or partially obstructed by the presence of fibrous bands of tissue. An imperforate hymen can also present with other abnormalities such as septa. An imperforate hymen can be displaced and its location may not be where it is expected. Other abnormalities of the hymen can exist including the presence of septa, displacement and a hymen that consists of microperforations. Uncommonly, a double hymen is present. The imperforate hymen is treated by excision and drainage. Sometimes a small border of hymenal tissue is left around the opening of the vagina.

Congenital adrenal hyperplasia can cause the abnormal development of the vagina. Vaginal adenosis is the abnormal presence of cervical and uterine tissue within the wall of the vagina. Ten percent of women have this condition and remain unsymptomatic. It rarely develops into a malignancy. Cloacal exstrophy is a condition when two vaginas are present. Vaginal agenesis or the complete absence of the vagina affects 1 out of 5,000 women. A hemivagina is the abnormal presence of a partial vagina that is attached to the wall of the functioning vagina. The hemivagina does not open to the normal vagina and is attached to an abnormal, second uterus. Vaginal hypoplasia is the under-development of the vagina and is found in instances of complete androgen insensitivity syndrome. Vaginal septa are structures consisting of fibrous tissue that block the vagina. The tissue extends horizontally, blocking or partially blocking the vaginal canal or transversely essentially creating two vaginas that connect to a normal uterus. Septa can prevent menstrual flow and result in painful intercourse, though some women do not have symptoms. Many vaginal anomalies are not detected at birth because the external genitalia can appear to be normal.

Structural anomaly	Incidence	Notes and synonyms	Treatment	Ref.
Imperforate hymen	1 in 1000-2000	Mucometrocolpos and Hematocolpos are complications	surgical	
Vaginal adenosis	1 in ten	often without symptoms	none	
Cloacal exstrophy	3.3 in 100,000	syn: Omphalocele-exstrophy-imperforate anus-spinal defects (OEIS)	surgical	
Vaginal agenesis	1 in 5000		surgical and ongoing	
Hemivagina		hemivagina does not open to the normal vagina and is attached to an abnormal, second uterus, also occurs in the syndrome Uterus didelphys with obstructed hemivagina and ipsilateral renal agenesis (OHVIRA)		
Vaginal hypoplasia				
Vaginal atresia				
Congenital vaginal fistula			surgical	
Septa	1 in 70,000	Septa can prevent menstrual flow and result in painful intercourse; others have no symptoms; Transverse septa often present with kidney defects.	surgical or none	
Persistent cloaca				
Urogenital sinus		urinary system and vagina open into a common channel		

== Epidemiology ==
The occurrence of vaginal defects varies widely and some are only known from case studies. The prevalence of an imperforate hymen is 1 in 1000.

== History ==
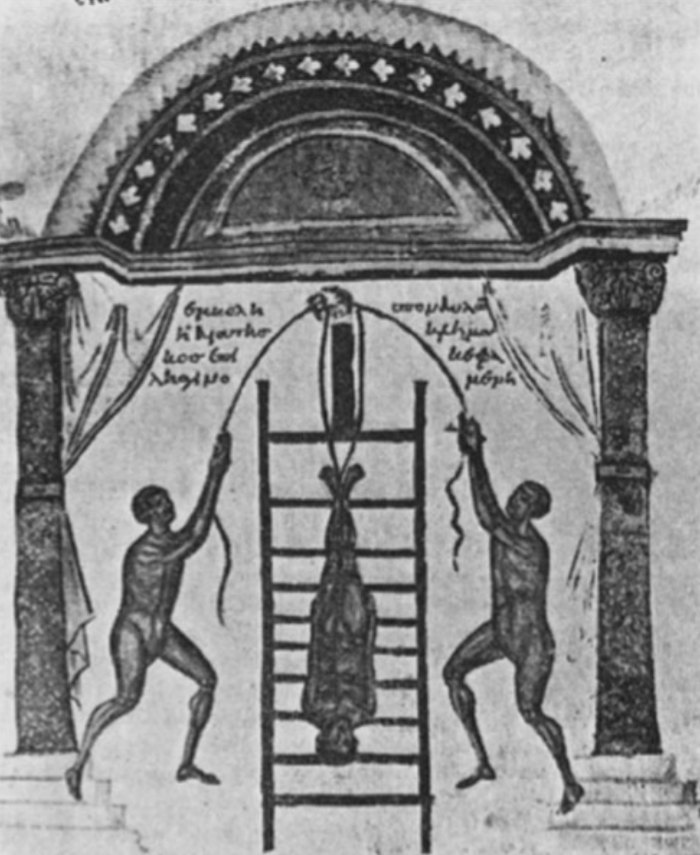
The ancient Greek method for treating a prolapsed uterus that has extended through and beyond the vaginal introitus

Notable is the mention of vaginal anomalies and pelvic organ prolapse in older cultures and locations. In 1500 B.C. Egyptians wrote about the "falling of the womb". In 400 B.C. a Greek physician documented his observations and treatments:

"After the patient had been tied to a ladder-like frame, she was tipped upward so that her head was toward the bottom of the frame. The frame was then moved upward and downward more or less rapidly for approximately 3–5 min. As the patient was in an inverted position, it was thought that the prolapsing organs of the genital tract would be returned to their normal position by the force of gravity and the shaking motion."

Hippocrates also described the prolapse of other organs out through the vagina. In 1521, Berengario da Carpi performed the first surgical treatment for prolapse. This was to tie a rope around the prolapse, tighten it for two days until it was no longer viable and cut it off. Wine, aloe, and honey were then applied to the stump.

References regarding the existence of vaginal anomalies related to müllerian defects have been traced back to 300 BC when a historian described a case of vaginal agenesis.

In 1823, other physicians proposed that vaginoplasty may provide treatment for pelvic organ prolapse. In 1830, the first dissection of the vagina was performed on a living woman. Other vaginal repairs were described in 1834 and treatment sometimes the suturing the edges of a vaginal defect. In 1859 a solution to vaginal elongation was to remove the cervix. In 1866, methods that resembled those used today came into practice. Surgery on the anterior vaginal wall at this time did not have to involve full-thickness repairs to be successful. Sim subsequently developed another procedure that did not require the full-thickness dissection of the vaginal wall. Shortly after this time it was proposed that reattaching the vagina to support structures was more successful and resulted in less recurrence. This same proposal was proposed again in 1976 but further studies indicated that the recurrence rate was not better. Further advances in 1961 began when surgeons started to reattach of the anterior vaginal wall to Cooper's ligament.

In 1955, surgical mesh began to be used to strengthen pelvic tissue. In 1970, tissue from pigs began to be used to strengthen the anterior vaginal wall in surgery. Beginning in 1976, improvement in suturing began along with the surgical removal of the vagina being used to treat prolapse of the bladder. In 1991, assumptions about the detailed anatomy of the pelvic support structures began to be questioned regarding the existence of some pelvic structures and the non-existence of others. More recently, the use of stem cells, robot-assisted laparoscopic surgery are being used during vaginectomy and vaginoplasty.

== See also ==
- Genetic counseling
- Genetic diagnosis of intersex
- List of obstetric topics
- Obstetric ultrasonography
- Prenatal testing
- Progestin-induced virilisation
