= Vaginal disease =

Pathological condition that affects the vagina

A vaginal disease is a pathological condition that affects part or all of the vagina.

== Types ==
=== Sexually transmitted infections ===
Sexually transmitted infections that affect the vagina include:

- Herpes genitalis. The herpes simplex virus (HSV) can infect the vulva, vagina, and cervix, and this may result in small, painful, recurring blisters and ulcers. It is also common for there to be an absence of any noticeable symptoms.
- Gonorrhea
- Chlamydia
- Trichomoniasis
- Human papillomavirus (HPV), which may cause genital warts.

Because of STIs, health authorities and other health outlets recommend safe sex practices when engaging in sexual activity.

=== Other infectious diseases ===
- Candidal vulvovaginitis
- Bacterial vaginosis (BV) associated with the Gardnerella, formerly called "nonspecific vaginitis"

=== Vaginismus ===
Vaginismus, which is not the same thing as vaginitis (an inflammation of the vagina), is an involuntary tightening of the vagina due to a conditioned reflex of the muscles in the area during vaginal penetration. It can affect any form of vaginal penetration, including sexual intercourse, insertion of tampons and menstrual cups, and the penetration involved in gynecological examinations. Various psychological and physical treatments are possible to help alleviate it.

=== Obstruction ===
A vaginal obstruction is often caused by an imperforate hymen or, less commonly, a transverse vaginal septum. A sign of vaginal obstruction is hydrocolpos, that is, accumulation of watery fluid within the vagina. It may extend to become hydrometrocolpos, that is, accumulation of watery fluid within the vagina as well as within the uterus.

=== Hypoplasia ===
Vaginal hypoplasia is the underdevelopment or incomplete development of the vagina. Vaginal hypoplasia can vary in severity from being smaller than normal to being completely absent. The absence of a vagina is a result of vaginal agenesis. Diagnostically, it may look similar to a vaginal obstruction. It is frequently associated with Mayer-Rokitansky-Küstner-Hauser (MRKH) syndrome, in which the most common result is an absent uterus in conjunction with a deformed or missing vagina, despite the presence of normal ovaries and normal external genitalia. It is also associated with cervical agenesis, in which the uterus is present but the uterine cervix is absent.

=== Lumps ===
The presence of unusual lumps in the wall or base of the vagina is always abnormal. The most common of these is Bartholin's cyst. The cyst, which can feel like a pea, is formed by a blockage in glands which normally supply the opening of the vagina. This condition is easily treated with minor surgery or silver nitrate. Other less common causes of small lumps or vesicles are herpes simplex. They are usually multiple and very painful with a clear fluid leaving a crust. They may be associated with generalized swelling and are very tender. Lumps associated with cancer of the vaginal wall are very rare and the average age of onset is seventy years. The most common form is squamous cell carcinoma, then cancer of the glands or adenocarcinoma and finally, and even more rarely, vaginal melanoma.

=== Persistent genital arousal disorder ===
Persistent genital arousal disorder (PGAD), which results in a spontaneous, persistent, and uncontrollable genital arousal, with or without orgasm, unrelated to any feelings of sexual desire. Because PGAD is relatively rare and, as its own concept apart from clitoral priapism (a rare, potentially painful medical condition in which, for an unusually extended period of time, the erect clitoris does not return to its relaxed state), has only been researched since 2001, there is little research into what may cure or remedy the disorder. In some recorded cases, PGAD was caused by, or caused, a pelvic arterial-venous malformation with arterial branches to the clitoris; surgical treatment was effective in these cases.

=== Other ===
- Vulvodynia
- Vaginal prolapse may result in the case of weakened pelvic muscles, which is a common result of childbirth; in the case of this prolapse, the rectum, uterus, or bladder pushes on the vagina, and severe cases result in the vagina protruding out of the body. Kegel exercises have been used to strengthen the pelvic floor, and may help prevent or remedy vaginal prolapse.
- Cervical cancer (may be prevented by Pap smear screening and HPV vaccines)
- Vaginal cancer is very rare, but its symptoms include abnormal vaginal bleeding or vaginal discharge.
- Air embolism is a potentially fatal condition where an air bubble travels throughout the bloodstream and can obstruct a vessel. It can result if air is blown into a pregnant woman's vagina during cunnilingus; this is because pregnant women have an increased vascularity of the vagina and uterus, and an air embolism can force air into the uterine veins.

== Symptoms ==
=== Discharge ===
Most vaginal discharges occur due to normal bodily functions, such as menstruation or sexual arousal (vaginal lubrication). Abnormal discharges, however, can indicate disease. Normal vaginal discharges include blood or menses (from the uterus), the most common, and clear fluid either as a result of sexual arousal or secretions from the cervix. Other non-infective causes include dermatitis. Non-sexually transmitted discharges occur from bacterial vaginosis, aerobic vaginitis and thrush or candidiasis. The final group of discharges include the sexually transmitted diseases gonorrhea, chlamydia, and trichomoniasis. The discharge from thrush is slightly pungent and white, that from trichomoniasis more foul and greenish, and that from foreign bodies resembling the discharge of gonorrhea, greyish or yellow and purulent (pus-like).

=== Sores ===
All sores involve a breakdown in the walls of the fine membrane of the vaginal wall. The most common of these are abrasions and small ulcers caused by trauma. While these can be inflicted during rape most are actually caused by excessive rubbing from clothing or improper insertion of a sanitary tampon. The typical ulcer or sore caused by syphilis is painless with raised edges. These are often undetected because they occur mostly inside the vagina. The sores of herpes which occur with vesicles are extremely tender and may cause such swelling that passing urine is difficult. In the developing world, a group of parasitic diseases also cause vaginal ulceration, such as leishmaniasis, but these are rarely encountered in the west. All of the aforementioned local vulvovaginal diseases are easily treated. Often, only shame prevents patients from presenting for treatment.

=== Inflammation ===
Vaginitis an inflammation of the vagina, such as caused by infection, hormone disturbance and irritation/allergy.

== See also ==
- List of bacterial vaginosis microbiota
