= Cryptomenorrhea =

Inability of menstrual blood to exit the uterus due to a malformed vagina

- Specialty: Gynecology

Cryptomenorrhea or cryptomenorrhoea, is a medical condition in which menstrual bleeding occurs but remains hidden due to a congenital septum or atresia blocking the vagina, resulting in symptoms of menstruation without external bleeding. It is commonly seen in cases of imperforate hymen. Specifically the endometrium is shed, but a congenital obstruction such as a vaginal septum or on part of the hymen retains the menstrual flow. A patient with cryptomenorrhea will appear to have amenorrhea but will experience cyclic menstrual pain. The condition is surgically correctable.

The patient usually presents at the age of puberty when the commencement of menstruation blood gets collected in the vagina and gives rise to symptoms.

== Symptoms ==
Primary amenorrhea and cyclical lower abdominal pain are the chief presenting complaints of hematocolpos. Therefore, the disorder may not be recognized until after a patient passes the expected age for menarche.

=== Signs ===
- Abdominal examination: swelling is felt on palpation.
- On vulval inspection: a tense, bulging, bluish membrane is seen, this finding varies according to the thickness of the obstructing membrane. It may be absent in patients with complete or partial vaginal agenesis.
- On rectal examination: a large bulging mass is felt.

=== Complications ===
- hematometra (collection of blood in the uterine cavity)
- hematosalpinx (collection of blood in fallopian tubes)
- endometriosis in long-standing cases
- in severe, untreated forms, infertility and urinary retention

== Diagnosis ==
Cryptomenorrhea may be diagnosed using ultrasound. The vagina is commonly seen filled with blood and the uterus usually appears pushed upward. Imperforate hymen may be diagnosed clinically in an adolescent showing a blue, protruding mass within the vaginal canal.

== Treatment ==
A simple cruciate incision followed by excision of tags of hymen allows drainage of the retained menstrual blood. A thicker transverse vaginal septum can be treated with Z-plasty. A blind vagina will require a partial or complete vaginoplasty. Hematosalpinx may require laparotomy or laparoscopy for removal and reconstruction of affected tube.Infertility may require assisted reproductive techniques.
