= Hydrocolpos =

Medical condition

Hydrocolpos is the distension of the vagina caused by accumulation of fluid due to congenital vaginal obstruction. The obstruction is often caused by an imperforate hymen or less commonly a transverse vaginal septum. The fluid consists of cervical and endometrial mucus or in rare instances urine accumulated through a vesicovaginal fistula proximal to the obstruction. In some cases, it is associated with Bardet-Biedl Syndrome. If it occurs in prepubertal girls, it may show up as abdominal swelling. It may be detected by using ultrasound. Prenatal diagnosis and early newborn imaging studies leads to early detection and treatment of these cases. It may also present at birth as a distended lower abdomen and vagina. It also associated with vaginal atresia. A high index of suspicion for hydrocolpos in a newborn presenting with fetal diagnosis of infraumbilical abdominal mass will facilitate timely intervention and prevention of complications.
