= Cervical agenesis =

- Other names: Cervical atresia, cervical dysgenesis
- Specialty: Gynecology

Cervical agenesis is a congenital disorder of the female genital system that manifests itself in the absence of a cervix, the connecting structure between the uterus and vagina. Milder forms of the condition, in which the cervix is present but deformed and nonfunctional, are known as cervical atresia or cervical dysgenesis.

== Presentation ==
Patients with cervical agenesis typically present in early adolescence, around the time of menarche, with amenorrhea and cyclic pelvic pain caused by the obstruction of menstrual flow from the uterus.

=== Complications ===
If untreated, the accumulation of menstrual fluid in the uterus caused by cervical agenesis can lead to hematocolpos, hematosalpinx, endometriosis, endometrioma and pelvic adhesions.

== Pathophysiology ==
Cervical agenesis arises during fetal development, during which time the paramesonephric duct fails to canalize in formation of the cervix.

== Diagnosis ==
The diagnosis of cervical agenesis can be made by magnetic resonance imaging, which is used to determine the presence or absence of a cervix. Although MRI can detect the absence of a cervix (agenesis), it is unable to show cervical dysgenesis (where the cervix is present, but malformed). Ultrasound is a less reliable imaging study, but it is often the first choice by gynecologists to establish a diagnosis and can identify a hematometra secondary to cervical agenesis.

== Management ==
The first line of therapy after diagnosis typically involves the administration of the combined oral contraceptive pill, medroxyprogesterone acetate or a gonadotropin-releasing hormone agonist to suppress menstruation and thereby relieve pain. Surgically, cervical agenesis has historically been treated through hysterectomy (removal of the uterus) to relieve symptoms caused by hematocolpos (the accumulation of menstrual fluid in the vagina). Other surgical methods of management involve the creation of an anastomotic connection between the uterus and vagina by neovaginoplasty or recanalization of the cervix. Outcomes in these cases are generally poor, since the natural functions of the cervix—such as mucus production and providing a barrier against ascending infection—cannot be replicated. Furthermore, the success rate of uterovaginal anastomosis is less than 50% and most patients require multiple surgeries while many develop cervical stenotis. Despite this, several pregnancies have been reported in women with cervical agenesis who underwent surgical treatment.

== Epidemiology ==
Cervical agenesis is estimated to occur in 1 in 80,000 females. It is often associated with deformity of the vagina; one study found that 48% of patients with cervical agenesis had a normal, functional vagina, while the rest of the cases were accompanied by vaginal hypoplasia.

== See also ==
- Müllerian agenesis
- Vaginal hypoplasia
