= Birth defects of diethylstilbestrol =

Medication side effects

Diethylstilbestrol (DES), a synthetic nonsteroidal estrogen which was previously used clinically to support pregnancy, has been linked to a variety of long-term adverse effects in women who were treated with it during pregnancy and in their offspring.

== First generation ==
An estimated 3 million pregnant women in the USA were prescribed DES from 1941 through 1971. DES was also widely prescribed to women in Canada, the UK, Europe, Australia, and New Zealand during a similar period. Women who were prescribed DES during pregnancy have been shown to have a modestly increased risk of breast cancer and breast cancer mortality.

== Second generation ==
=== DES daughters ===
DES gained notoriety when it was shown to cause a rare vaginal tumor in girls and young women who had been exposed to this drug in utero. In 1971, the New England Journal of Medicine published a report showing that seven of eight girls and young women (ages 14 to 22) who had been diagnosed with vaginal clear cell adenocarcinoma had been exposed prenatally to DES. Subsequent studies have shown an approximate 40-fold increased risk of vaginal/cervical clear cell adenocarcinoma in women exposed in utero to DES. As a consequence of this evidence, DES is considered an established human carcinogen. DES was one of the first transplacental carcinogens discovered in humans, meaning a toxin could cross the placenta and harm the fetus. It had originally been believed that the placenta protected the developing fetus but it is now known that is not true. Daughters exposed to DES in utero may also have an increased risk of moderate to severe cervical squamous cell dysplasia and an increased risk of breast cancer.

In addition to its carcinogenic properties, DES is a known teratogen, an agent capable of causing malformations in daughters and sons who were exposed in utero. DES-exposed daughters are at an increased risk of abnormalities of the reproductive tract, including vaginal epithelial changes such as vaginal adenosis (which means a type of cell normally found in the uterus, columnar cells, are also present in the vagina), an increased cervical transformation zone, and uterine abnormalities, such as T-shaped uterus. These anomalies contribute to an increased risk of infertility and adverse pregnancy outcomes in prenatally DES-exposed daughters. The most recent published research on DES daughters' adverse health outcomes documented by the U.S. National Cancer Institute (NCI) appears in the October 6, 2011 issue of the New England Journal of Medicine under the authorship of RN Hoover et al., and lists these adverse effects and risk factors: Cumulative risks in women exposed to DES, as compared with those not exposed, were as follows: for infertility, 33.3% vs. 15.5%; spontaneous abortion, 50.3% vs. 38.6%; preterm delivery, 53.3% vs. 17.8%; loss of second-trimester pregnancy, 16.4% vs. 1.7%; ectopic pregnancy, 14.6% vs. 2.9%; preeclampsia, 26.4% vs. 13.7%; stillbirth, 8.9% vs. 2.6%; early menopause, 5.1% vs. 1.7%; grade 2 or higher cervical intraepithelial neoplasia, 6.9% vs. 3.4%; and breast cancer at 40 years of age or older, 3.9% vs. 2.2%. Daughters with prenatal exposure to DES may also have an increased risk of uterine fibroids, and incompetent cervix in adulthood.

In an animal model designed to study environmental estrogens, DES turned out to be an obesogen capable of causing adult weight gain in female mice which had been exposed to DES during neonatal development. The excess weight gain was not apparent at birth or in infancy, but occurred in adulthood.

=== DES sons ===
Initially, fewer studies documented risks of prenatal exposure to DES on males (referred to as "DES sons"). In the 1970s and early 1980s, studies published on prenatally DES-exposed males investigated increased risk of testicular cancer, infertility and urogenital abnormalities in development, such as cryptorchidism and hypospadias. Research published in the U.S. by Palmer et al. in 2009 further confirmed evidence of these findings. Additional research published in Finland in 2012 has further confirmed an increased risk of cryptorchidism among males exposed prenatally to DES.

The U.S. Centers for Disease Control (CDC) has acknowledged the link between DES exposure and noncancerous epididymal cysts.

The American Association of Clinical Endocrinologists (AACE) has documented that prenatal DES exposure in males is positively linked to a condition known as hypogonadism (low testosterone levels) that may require treatment with testosterone replacement therapy.

=== Sexual differentiation ===
Research investigating the possible behavioral and psychosexual effects of prenatal DES exposure in human males occurred as early as 1973. This research has centered on a long-standing question of whether prenatal exposure to DES in offspring of mothers who were prescribed DES may have included sexual orientation and gender-related behavioral effects and physical intersex conditions. Kaplan published the first-known medical study (1959) of intersex condition in a male prenatally-exposed to DES.

There is some evidence linking prenatal hormonal influences on sexual orientation, gender identity and transgender development, but this is an area of behavioral research that remains controversial. Several published studies in the medical literature have examined the hypothesis that prenatal exposure to estrogens (including DES) may cause significant developmental impact on sexual differentiation of the brain, and on subsequent behavioral and gender identity development in exposed males and females. One of the leading investigators of this area of research is June Reinisch, former director of the Kinsey Institute for Research in Sex, Gender, and Reproduction. Reinisch cited several cases of "male feminization" among prenatally DES-exposed males.

An Internet survey reported a high rate of transgender and intersex identity in people assigned male at birth participating in an online support forum for DES sons. Of 500 respondents, about 32% identified as transgender, transsexual, gender dysphoric, or intersex (90, 48, 17, and 3, respectively). The first real study on transgender identity in people assigned male at birth who were prenatally exposed to DES was published in 2020 and found a very low incidence of transgenderism (2 in about 930 or around 0.2%). It wasn't possible to determine whether the incidence was higher than in controls due to the small number of cases, but the findings did indicate in any case that the influence of prenatal DES exposure on likelihood of being transgender would be only small at most. A French 2024 study on 253 DES males, however, found almost eightfold occurrence, 1.58%, of male to female transsexuals among DES males.

=== DES Daughters and Sons study ===
A study conducted by the US National Cancer Institute, which assessed about 5,600 women and 2,600 men who had documented prenatal exposure to DES, called "DES Daughters" and "DES Sons", respectively, found that "DES Daughters were just as likely as unexposed women to be left-handed. DES Sons were slightly more likely to be left-handed than unexposed men (14% vs. 11%, respectively). The researchers found no association between DES exposure and reported mental illness in DES Daughters, although the authors cautioned that this aspect may be under-represented due to the nature of self-reported data. In addition, no association was found between DES exposure and anorexia or bulimia.

== Psychological anomalies ==
Most of the initial research documenting the psychological effects of prenatal DES exposure was poorly conducted, often by mail card. Despite that, some more carefully conducted studies show a clear link to depression, and a more recent French study asserts that there was an 83% increase in psychological disorders for offspring that were prenatally exposed to DES.

== Third generation ==
Current research also looks at DES in the third generation. These are the grandchildren of women who were given DES during pregnancy and whose mother or father was therefore exposed to DES in utero. Studies of the third generation are important because DES might be associated with epigenetic changes, which involve changes to the way genes behave (not involving the DNA itself) that may be heritable from one generation to another. If epigenetic changes occur and are heritable, studies of the DES-exposed third generation have implications for the influence of environmental endocrine disruptors on human health and evolution.

Recent studies from the US National Cancer Institute (NCI) show that the daughters of women who were exposed in utero to DES may be less likely than the unexposed to have regular menstrual periods. A possible increased risk of infertility in the older, third generation daughters was also noted. The NCI study provides limited evidence of an increased risk of birth defects in the sons or daughters of women who were exposed prenatally to DES. An increased risk of ovarian cancer in the daughters of women exposed in utero was observed, but it was based on three cases of almost 800, so the finding is considered preliminary and requires further study.

Some evidence suggests the sons of prenatally DES-exposed women might have an increased risk of hypospadias, but other studies suggest the increase in risk might not be as great as once thought.
