= Hematometra =

Accumulation of blood within the uterus

- Other names: Hemometra
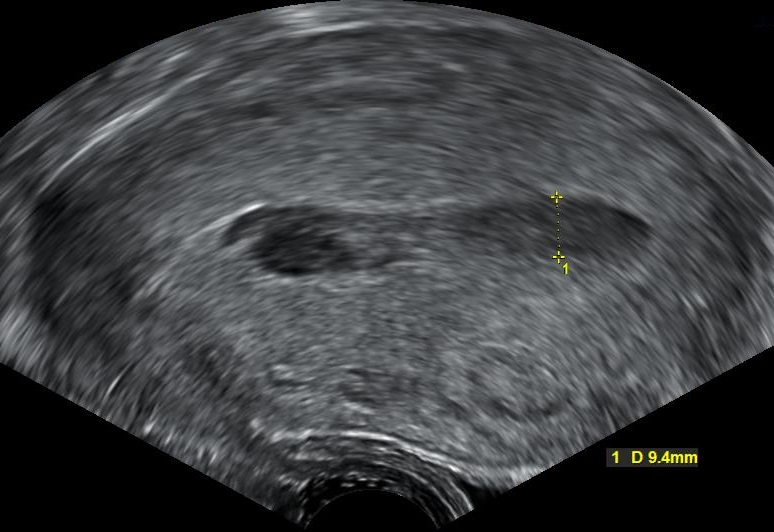
- Transvaginal ultrasonography of a hematometra after childbirth, seen as a hypoechoic (darker) area within the uterine cavity. The cervix is located to the left in the image, and the fundus is located to the right.
- Specialty: Gynecology

Hematometra is a medical condition involving collection or retention of blood in the uterus. It is most commonly caused by an imperforate hymen or a transverse vaginal septum.

== Signs and symptoms ==
Hematometra typically presents as cyclic, cramping pain in the midline of the pelvis or lower abdomen. Patients may also report urinary frequency and urinary retention. Premenopausal women with hematometra often experience abnormal vaginal bleeding, including dysmenorrhea (pain during menstruation) or amenorrhea (lack of menstruation), while postmenopausal women are more likely to be asymptomatic. Due to the accumulation of blood in the uterus, patients may develop low blood pressure or a vasovagal response. When palpated, the uterus will typically feel firm and enlarged.

== Pathophysiology ==
Hematometra develops when the uterus becomes distended with blood secondary to obstruction or atresia of the lower reproductive tract—the uterus, cervix or vagina—which would otherwise provide an outflow for menstrual blood. It is most commonly caused by congenital abnormalities, including imperforate hymen, transverse vaginal septum or vaginal hypoplasia. Other causes are acquired, such as cervical stenosis, intrauterine adhesions, endometrial cancer, and cervical cancer.

Additionally, hematometra may develop as a complication of uterine or cervical surgery such as endometrial ablation, where scar tissue in the endometrium can "wall off" sections of endometrial glands and stroma causing blood to accumulate in the uterine cavity. It can also develop after abortion, as well as after childbirth. It can also develop after female genital mutilation.

== Diagnosis ==
Although hematometra can often be diagnosed based purely on the patient's history of amenorrhea and cyclic abdominal pain, as well as a palpable pelvic mass on examination, the diagnosis can be confirmed by ultrasound, which will show blood pooled in the uterus and an enlargement of the uterine cavity. A pyelogram or laparoscopy may assist in diagnosing any congenital disorder that is suspected to be the underlying cause of the hematometra.

== Management ==
Hematometra is usually treated by surgical cervical dilation to drain the blood from the uterus. Other treatments target the underlying cause of the hematometra; for example, a hysteroscopy may be required to resect adhesions that have developed following a previous surgery. If the cause of the hematometra is unclear, a biopsy of endometrial tissue can be taken to test for the presence of a neoplasm (cancer). Antibiotics may be given as prophylaxis against the possibility of infection.

== See also ==
- Hematocolpos, collection of menstrual blood in the vagina
