= Vaginal hypoplasia =

Birth defect in which the vagina fails to completely form

- Other names: Congenital absence of vagina
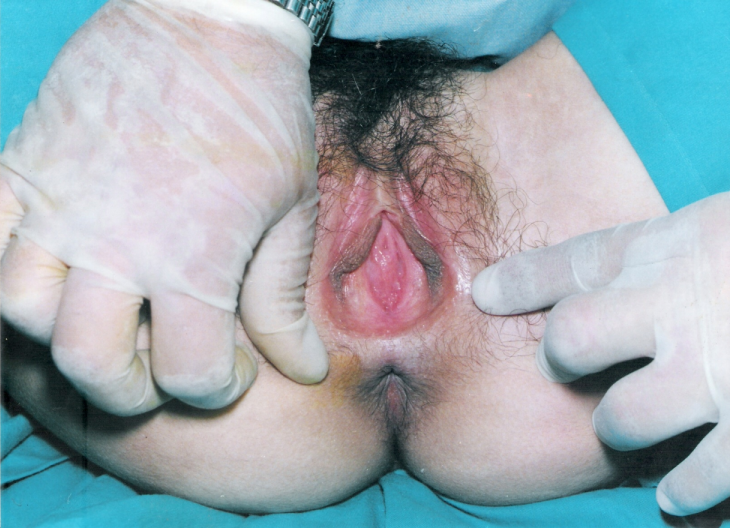
- Vaginal hypoplasia in a patient with Müllerian agenesis
- Specialty: Gynecology, medical genetics

Vaginal hypoplasia is the underdevelopment or incomplete development of the vagina. It is a birth defect or congenital abnormality of the female genitourinary system.

== Signs and symptoms ==
Vaginal hypoplasia can vary in severity from being smaller than normal to being completely absent. The absence of a vagina is a result of vaginal agenesis. Diagnostically, it may look similar to a vaginal obstruction such as can be caused by an imperforate hymen or, less commonly, a transverse vaginal septum.

It is frequently associated with Mayer-Rokitansky-Küstner-Hauser syndrome, in which the most common result is an absent uterus in conjunction with a deformed or missing vagina, despite the presence of normal ovaries and normal external genitalia. It is also associated with cervical agenesis, in which the uterus is present but the uterine cervix is absent. The situation is most urgent where there is a menstruating uterus with an obstructed uterovaginal outflow, leading to hematometra. In this case prompt medical action is required.

== Causes ==
The main causes are Müllerian agenesis and complete androgen insensitivity syndrome.

== Treatment ==
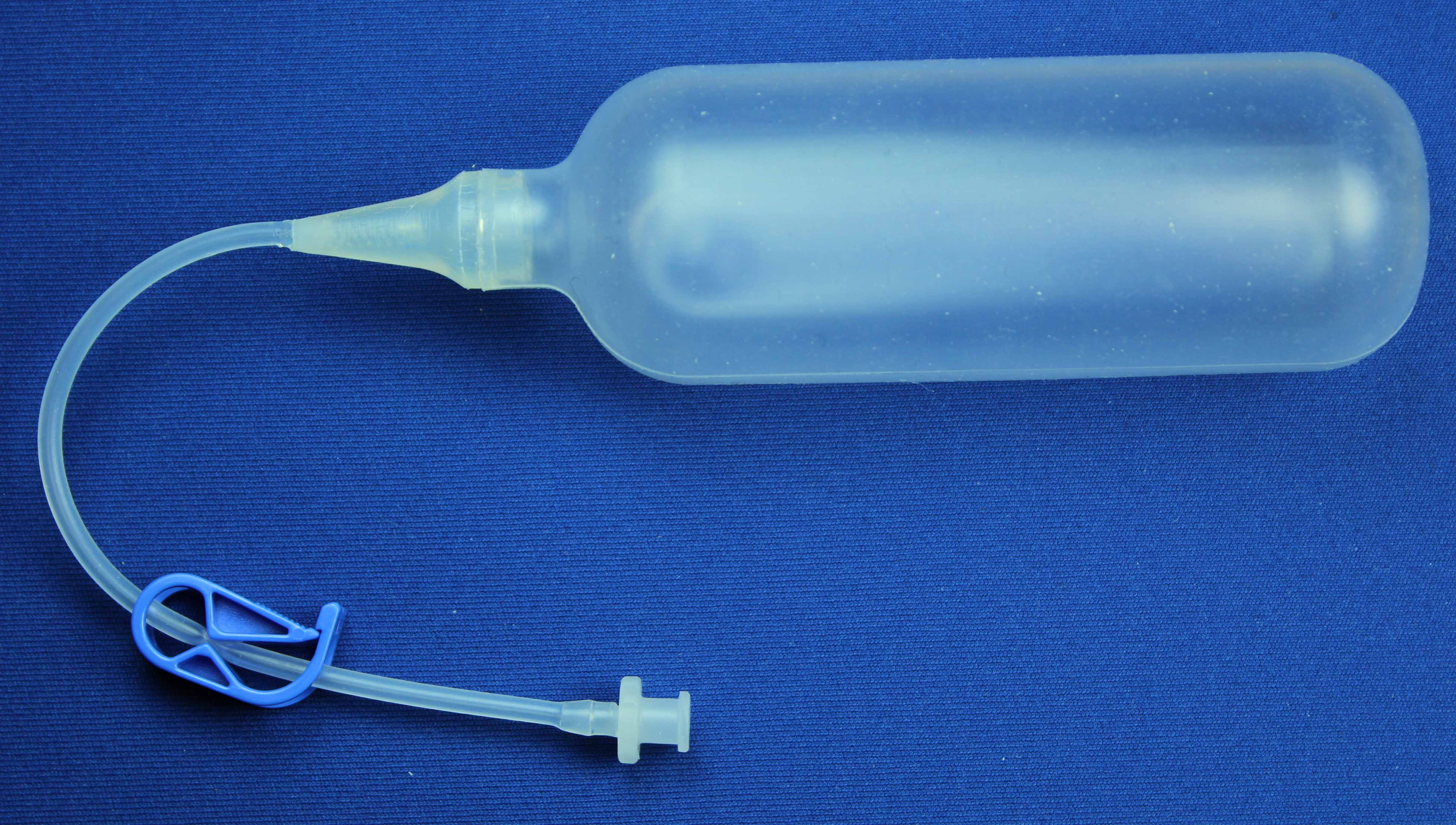
Inflatable vaginal expander ZSI 200 NS

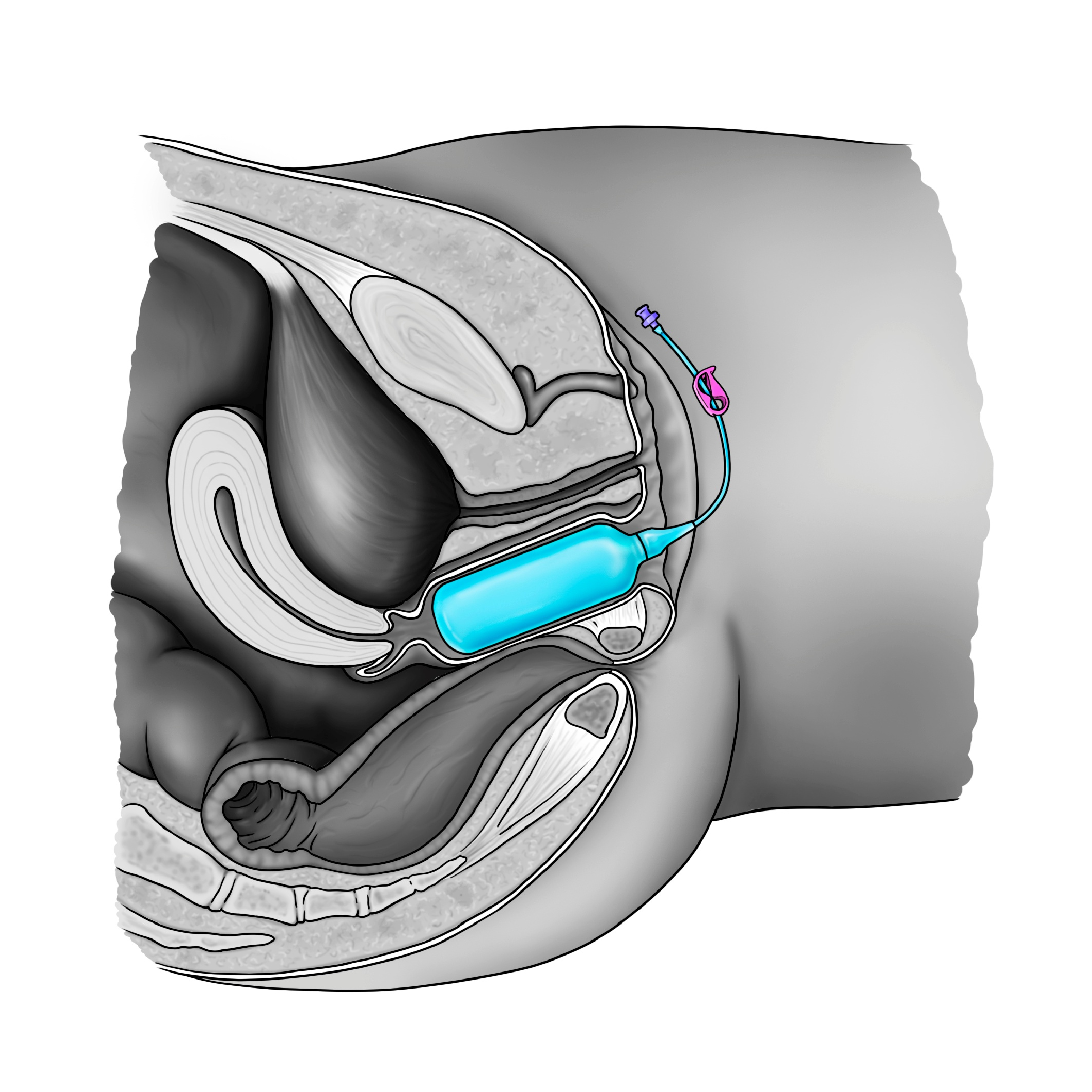
ZSI 200 NS vaginal expander stretching the female vagina

In order to facilitate sexual intercourse, the main treatments are self-dilation methods (using intra-vaginal cylinders or inflatable expanders (vaginal stents) of increasing size) and surgical vaginoplasty to lengthen the vagina. Self-dilation has a high success rate, estimated at 75%, and is usually the first-line treatment due to low surgical invasiveness. Overall, the complication rates are significantly lower with dilation than with vaginoplasty.

Surgery is indicated when there is inability or reluctance to perform self-dilation, or where it is performed but with failed result. The vaginoplasty is performed around the inflatable expander which maintains the neovagina against the pelvic wall after the surgery and favors the process of microscopic neovascularization while reducing the risks for hematoma. One appropriate surgical variant is the Vecchietti technique. In this procedure, an olive-shaped pressure device is pressed towards the potential vaginal space by a thread that goes through the skin, behind the urinary bladder and pubic bone and exits the skin in the hypogastrium, where it is attached to a plate that provides counter-traction. Vaginoplasty can also be performed using a skin graft or an intestinal graft. Traction vaginoplasty such as the Vecchietti technique seems to have the highest success rates both anatomically (99%) and functionally (96%), whereas skin graft procedures and intestinal procedures have the lowest successful outcomes (83–95%).

After vaginoplasty, available evidence suggests that continued self-dilation is needed to maintain the patency in periods of coital inactivity. A vaginal expander can be used regularly to prevent post-operative vaginal retraction.

== Epidemiology ==
Vaginal hypoplasia is estimated to occur in 1 in 4,000–5,000 live female births. It is often unnoticed until adolescence when pain and a lack of menstrual flow indicates the condition.

== See also ==
- Cervical agenesis
- Müllerian agenesis
