= Cervical stenosis =

Cervical stenosis can refer to:

- Cervical spinal stenosis
- Stenosis of uterine cervix
