= August Mayer =

August Mayer may refer to:

- August L. Mayer (1885–1944), German curator, art historian and art collector
- August Franz Josef Karl Mayer (1787–1865), German anatomist and physiologist

== See also ==
- Auguste Étienne François Mayer (1805–1890), French painter and lithographer
- August Meyer (1851–1905), American mining engineer
