= Vaginal transplantation =

Vaginal tissue transplantation procedure

Vaginal transplantation is procedure whereby donated or laboratory-grown vagina tissue is used to create a 'neovagina'. It is most often used in women who have vaginal aplasia (the congenital absence of a vagina).

== Background ==
Vaginal aplasia is a rare medical condition in which the vagina does not form properly before birth. Those with the condition may have a partially formed vagina, or none at all. The condition is typically treated by reconstructive surgery. First a space is surgically created where the vagina would typically exist. Then tissue from another part of the body is harvested, molded into the shape of a vagina, and grafted into the vagina cavity. This technique has significant drawbacks. Typically, the implanted tissue does not function normally as a muscle, which can lead to low enjoyment of sexual intercourse. Additionally, stenosis (narrowing of the cavity) can occur over time. Most women require multiple surgeries before a satisfactory result is achieved. An alternative to traditional reconstructive surgery is transplantation.

== Donor technique ==
In a handful of cases, a woman with vaginal aplasia has received a successful vagina transplant donated by her mother. The first such case is believed to have occurred in 1970, with no signs of rejection taking place after three years. In at least one case, a woman who received such a transplant was able to conceive and give birth. In 1981, a 12-year-old girl with vaginal aplasia received a vaginal wall implant from her mother. She became sexually active seven years later, without incident. At age 24, she conceived and carried a child to term. The child was born via cesarean section.

== Laboratory-grown technique ==
In April 2014, a team of scientists led by Anthony Atala reported that they had successfully transplanted laboratory-grown vaginas into four female teenaged girls with a rare medical condition called Mayer-Rokitansky-Küster-Hauser syndrome that causes the vagina to develop improperly, or sometimes not at all. Between 1 of 1,500 to 4,000 females are born with this condition.

The four patients began treatment between May 2005 and August 2008. In each case, the medical research team began by taking a small sample of genital tissue from the teenager's vulva. The sample was used as a seed to grow additional tissue in the lab which was then placed in a vaginal shaped, biodegradable mold. Vaginal-lining cells were placed on the inside of the tube, while muscle cells were attached to the outside. Five to six weeks later, the structure was implanted into the patients, where the tissue continued to grow and connected with the girls' circulatory and other bodily systems. After about eight years, all four patients reported normal function and pleasure levels during sexual intercourse according to the Female Sexual Function Index questionnaire, a validated self-report tool. No adverse results or complications were reported.

In two of the four women, the vagina was attached to the uterus, making pregnancy possible. No pregnancies were reported, however, during the study period. Martin Birchall, who works on tissue engineering, but was not involved in the study, said it "addressed some of the most important questions facing translation of tissue engineering technologies." Commentary published by the National Health Service (NHS) called the study "an important proof of concept" and said it showed that tissue engineering had "a great deal of potential." However, the NHS also cautioned that the sample size was very small and further research was necessary to determine the general viability of the technique.

The laboratory-grown autologous transplant technique could also be used on women who want reconstructive surgery due to cancer or other disease once the technique is perfected. However, more studies will need to be conducted and the techniques further developed before commercial production can begin.
