= Michel aplasia =

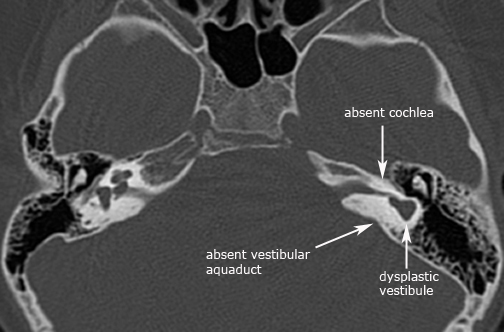
- CT scan showing Michel aplasia

Michel aplasia, also known as complete labyrinthine aplasia (CLA), is a congenital abnormality of the inner ear. It is characterized by the bilateral absence of differentiated inner ear structures and results in complete deafness (anacusis). Michel aplasia should not be confused with michel dysplasia. It may affect one or both ears.

Aplasia is the medical term for body parts that are "wholly or largely absent" due to developmental issues. In Michel aplasia, the undeveloped (anaplastic) body part is the bony labyrinth of the inner ear. Other nearby structures may be underdeveloped as well.

== Epidemiology ==
Michel aplasia is a rare disease. It was first described by P. Michel in 1863. He found it in the autopsy report of an 11-year-old child who was deaf and died in Children's Hospital of Strasbourg.

== Pathology ==
Michel aplasia is thought to result from failure of development of the otic placode, due to developmental arrest at the third week of gestation. The common cavity deformity, a confluence of illdefined cochlea and vestibular organ results from a disruption during the fourth and fifth week. An arrest in fifth or sixth week of gestation result in cochlear aplasia or cochlear hypoplasia respectively.

=== Associations ===
Abnormal development of the skeletal portions of the second arch

- Nondifferentiation of the stapes, with resultant absence of round and oval window.
- Abnormal course of the facial nerve.

Skull base abnormalities

- Hypoplasia of the petrous temporal bone.
- Hypoplastic and sclerotic petrous apex may mimic labyrinthitis ossificans.
- Platybasia
- Aberrant course of jugular veins.

== Molecular pathology ==
Michel aplasia is associated with LAMM syndrome (labyrinthine aplasia, microtia and microdontia), which is caused by mutation FGF3 gene on chromosome 11q13 which encodes fibroblast growth factor 3.

Congenital deafness with Michel aplasia, microtia and microdontia is inherited in an autosomal recessive manner.

== Diagnosis ==
Diagnosis is based on clinical findings:

- Profound congenital sensorineural deafness is present.
- CT scan or MRI of the inner ear shows no recognizable structure in the inner ear.
- As Michel aplasia is associated with LAMM syndrome there will be microtia and microdontia present (small-sized teeth).

Molecular genetic Testing determines that FGF3 is the only gene whose mutation can cause congenital deafness with Michel aplasia, microdontia and microtia.

Carrier testing for at-risk relatives requires identification of mutations which are responsible for occurrence of disease in the family.

== Prevention (of secondary complications) ==
- Presence of inner ear abnormalities lead to delayed gross development of child caused by balance impairment and profound deafness which increases the risk of trauma and accidents.
- Incidence of accidents can be decreased by using visual or vibrotactile alarm systems in homes as well as in schools.
- Anticipatory education of parents, health providers, and educational programs about hazards can help.

== Treatment ==
- Enrollment in appropriate early intervention programs for the deaf and hard of hearing.
- Consideration of vibrotactile hearing devices or brain stem implants for individuals with congenital labyrinthine aplasia.
- Evaluation for cochlear implantation in patients who have cochleovestibular nerve and a cochlear remnant. This is done in children above the age of 12 months having severe or profound hearing loss. Cochlear implants in infant and children is notably contested by the Deaf community.

=== Surveillance ===
This can be done by annual evaluations by a multidisciplinary team involving an otolaryngologist, clinical geneticist, pediatrician, the expertise of an educator of the deaf, and a neurologist is appropriate.
