= T-shaped uterus =

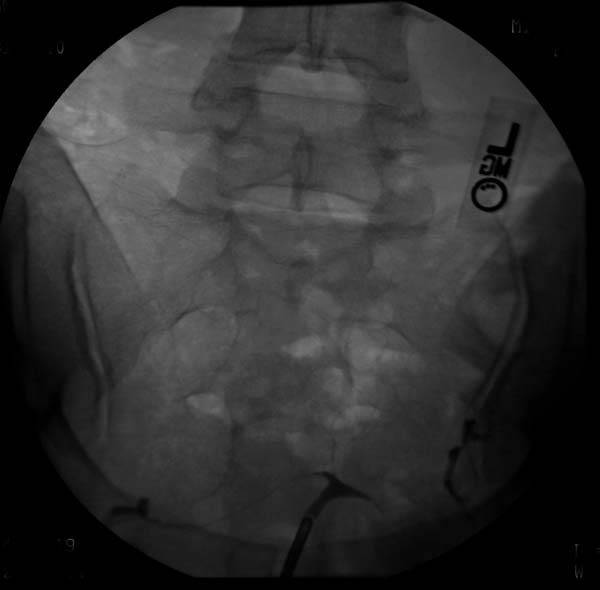
- Hysterosalpingography of a T-shaped uterus.
- Specialty: Urology

A t-shaped uterus is a type of uterine malformation wherein the uterus is shaped resembling the letter T. This is typically observed in DES-exposed women. It is recognised in the ESHRE/ESGE classification, and is associated with failed implantation, increased risk of ectopic pregnancy, miscarriage and preterm delivery. There is a surgical procedure to correct the malformation.

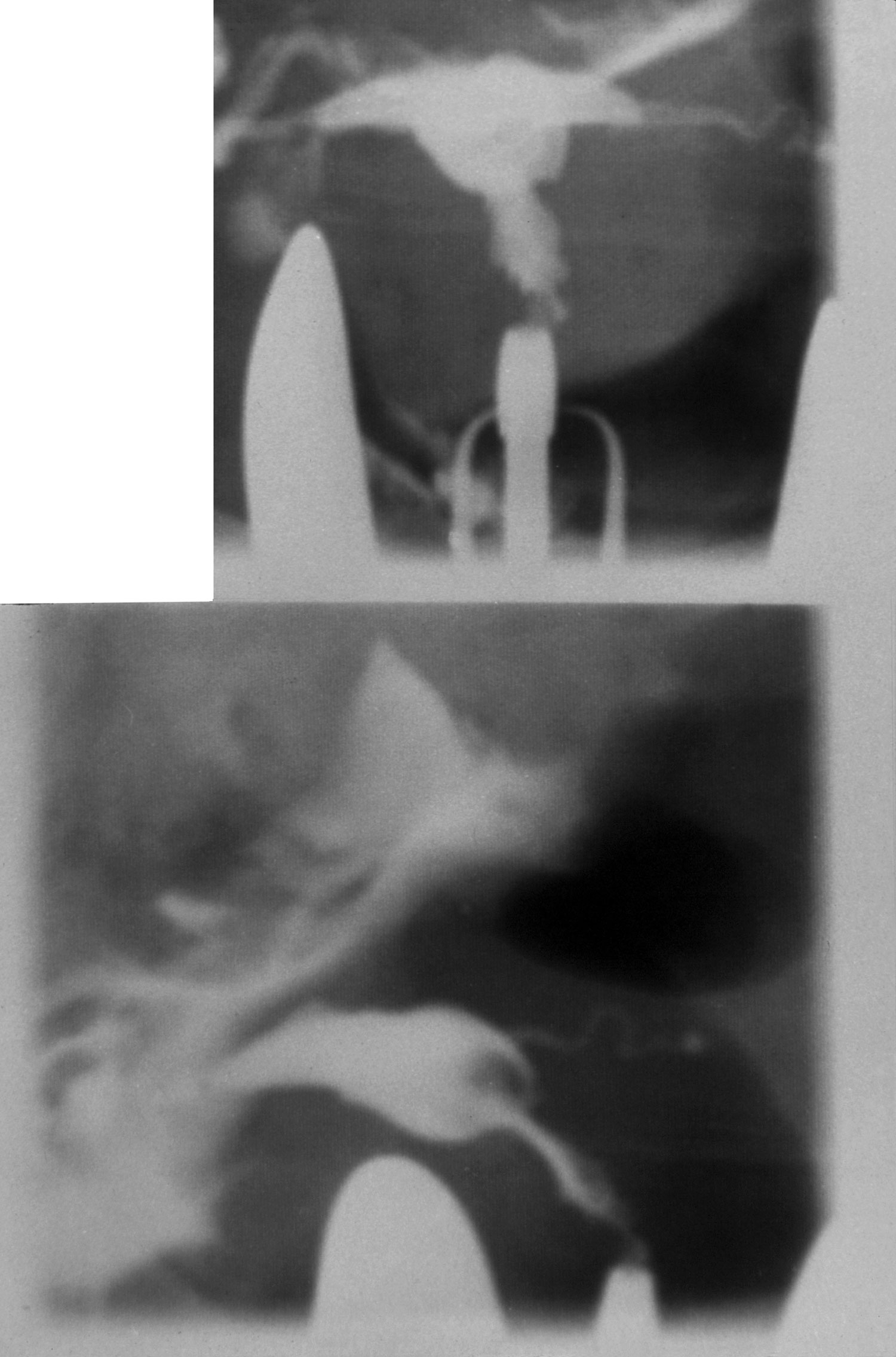
A T-shaped uterus with circular constriction noted around the proximal portion of the marker. The lower uterus appears tapered and narrow.

== Causes ==
The T-shaped malformation is commonly associated with in-utero exposure to diethylstilbestrol (the so-called "DES daughters"). It is also presented congenitally.

== Diagnosis ==
Women are often diagnosed with this condition after several failed pregnancies, proceeded by exploratory diagnostic procedures, such as magnetic resonance, sonography, and particularly hysterosalpingography. In such studies, a widening of the interstitial and isthmus of uterine tube is observed, as well as constrictions or narrowing of the uterus as a whole, especially the lower and lateral portions, hence the "t" denomination. The uterus might be simultaneously reduced in volume, and other abnormalities might be concomitantly present.

== Prognosis ==
Although fertility is impaired, T-shaped uterus sufferers can bear children. However, they carry a greater risk of complications, such as miscarriages, reduced fertility and preterm births, both before and after any treatment.

The current surgical procedure to treat this malformation, termed a hysteroscopic correction or metroplasty, is undertaken by performing a lateral incision of the uterine walls, and can return the organ to a normal morphology, while improving the patient's former reproductive performance. It is considered a low-risk procedure, and can also improve term delivery rate by up to 10-fold, as long as the endometrium is considered to be in good condition. However, risks after the procedure include placenta accreta, Asherman's syndrome and severe haemorrhage.

== See also ==
- Vaginal adenosis
