= Aplasia =

Absence of an organ or tissue from birth

Aplasia (/əˈpleɪʒə/; from Greek a, "not", "no" + plasis, "formation") is a birth defect where an organ or tissue is wholly or largely absent. It is caused by a defect in a developmental process.

Aplastic anemia is the failure of the body to produce blood cells. It may occur at any time, and has multiple causes.

== Types ==
=== Pure red cell aplasia ===
Pure red cell aplasia (PRCA) is caused by the selective destruction or inhibition of erythroid progenitor or precursor cells. It is characterized by anemia and reticulocytopenia and can be chronic or acute. Diamond–Blackfan anemia is a type of PRCA that occurs at birth. PRCA can be acquired as a primary disorder or as a result of another disorder. Immunosuppressive drugs, particularly corticosteroids, will usually result in a temporary or permanent remission. The final outcome is primarily determined by the underlying disorder.

=== Aplasia cutis congenita ===
Aplasia cutis congenita is a condition in which some or large portions of the skin is missing at birth. The disorder is most commonly seen on the scalp, often as a solitary lesion without other abnormalities. The condition may be caused by epidermolysis bullosa, specific teratogens, or intrauterine infections, or it may be caused by chromosomal abnormalities, ectodermal dysplasias, or other malformation syndromes.

=== Radial aplasia ===
Radial aplasia is a condition in which the radius does not form. The radius runs from the elbow to the wrist, where the thumb is located. With radial aplasia, the arm can look misshapen and bent. The thumb could also be absent or shorter than usual.

=== Sertoli cell-only syndrome ===
Sertoli cell-only syndrome (SCOS), also known as germ cell aplasia, is defined by azoospermia where the testicular seminiferous tubules are lined solely with sertoli cells. Sertoli cells contribute to the formation of the blood-testis barrier and aid in sperm generation. These cells respond to follicle-stimulating hormone, which is secreted by the hypothalamus and aids in spermatogenesis. Men often learn they have Sertoli cell-only syndrome between the ages of 20 and 40 when they are checked for infertility and found to produce no sperm. Other signs and symptoms are uncommon, yet in some cases, an underlying cause of SCO syndrome, such as Klinefelter syndrome, may produce other symptoms.

Most cases of SCO syndrome are idiopathic, however, causes may include deletions of genetic material on Y-chromosome regions, particularly the azoospermia factor area. Other factors include chemical or toxin exposure, previous exposure to radiation therapy, and a history of severe trauma. A testicular biopsy confirms the diagnosis of SCO syndrome. Although there is no effective treatment at the moment, assisted reproductive technology may help some men with SCO syndrome reproduce.

=== Pulmonary aplasia ===
Pulmonary aplasia is a rare congenital pathology characterized by the unilateral or bilateral absence of lung tissue. It is distinct from pulmonary agenesis, which, while similar, has a short-blind ending bronchus in aplasia. Because bilateral pulmonary aplasia is not feasible, it is usually unilateral. It is frequently associated with other congenital abnormalities, primarily cardiovascular, and has been shown to occur with the VACTERL syndrome.

=== Thymic aplasia ===
Thymic aplasia is a rare primary immunodeficiency with autosomal or X-linked recessive inheritance, characterized by thymus atrophy in the absence of other congenital abnormalities, profound T-cell deficiency, and normal or increased serum immunoglobulin levels. Patients present with chronic or recurring infections in infancy, such as candidiasis, skin, pulmonary, and urinary tract infections, chronic diarrhea, and failure to thrive.

=== Optic nerve aplasia ===
Optic nerve aplasia (ONA) is a congenital optic nerve anomaly defined as the absence of the optic nerve head, the retinal blood vessels, ganglion cells of the retina, and optic nerve fibers in an otherwise normal eye. Clinically, the condition is characterized by a lack of light perception, an afferent pupillary defect, and a fundus appearance of an absent optic nerve head and retinal vessels, as well as other ocular and nonocular abnormalities. Bilateral ONA has been linked to systemic anomalies, whereas unilateral ONA is seen in otherwise healthy people.

=== Aplastic anemia ===
Aplastic anemia is a bone marrow failure syndrome characterized by peripheral pancytopenia and bone marrow hypoplasia. Although the anemia is usually normocytic, mild macrocytosis can be seen in conjunction with stress erythropoiesis and raised fetal hemoglobin levels. Aplastic anemia patients present with symptoms related to a decrease in hematopoietic cell production in the bone marrow. The onset is gradual, and the first symptom is frequently anemia or bleeding, though a high temperature or infections may be present at the onset. The following are examples of specific manifestations:

- Anemia: Pallor, headache, palpitations, dyspnea, fatigue, or foot swelling
- Thrombocytopenia: Mucosal and gingival bleeding, as well as petechial rashes, may occur.
- Neutropenia: Can cause overt infections, recurring infections, or mouth and pharyngeal ulcers.

The majority of cases of aplastic anemia are idiopathic, and seeking a possible cause is frequently unproductive.

== Epidemiology ==
Aplasia is a rare condition. Radial aplasia and pure red cell aplasia, particularly the acquired form of pure red cell aplasia, are the most common types. Radial aplasia affects about one in every 30,000 newborns. Radial ray deficiencies, such as radial aplasia, are one of the most common congenital arm disabilities. Congenital pure red cell aplasia is uncommon, with an estimated 5 to 7 cases per million births. The acquired form is more prevalent.

== See also ==
- Atrophy
- Hyperplasia
- Hypoplasia
- Neoplasia
- List of biological development disorders
