= Hematosalpinx =

Bleeding into the fallopian tubes

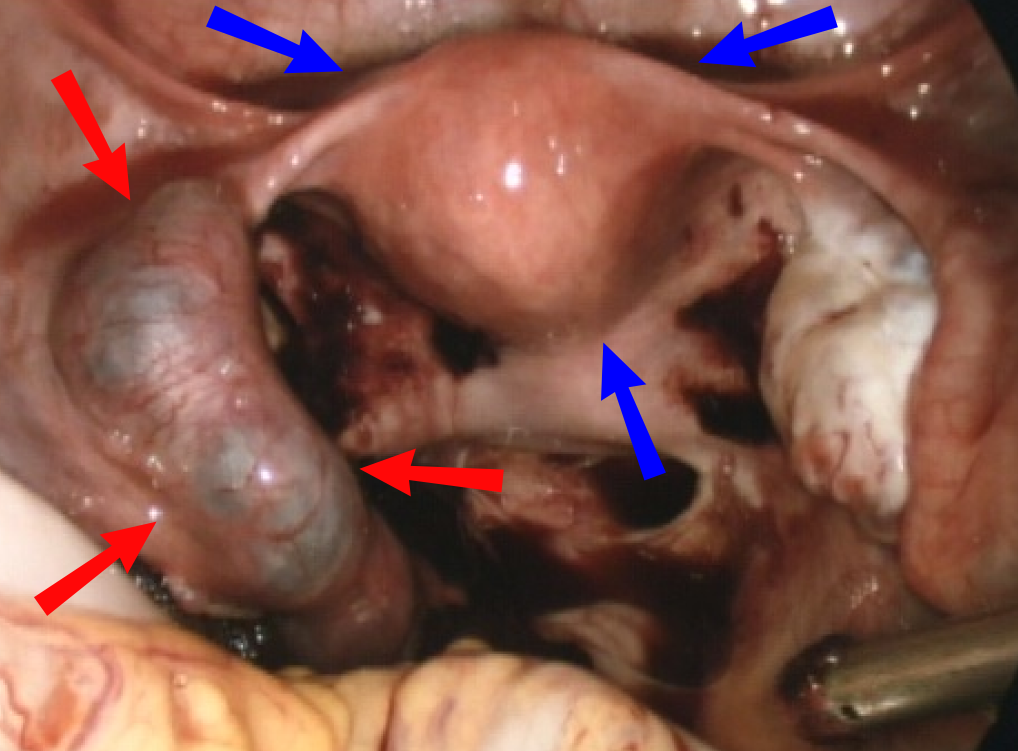
- Laparoscopic view, looking from superiorly to inferiorly in the peritoneal cavity which has been pumped up with carbon dioxide gas to visualize the uterus (marked by blue arrows). On the left fallopian tube there is an ectopic pregnancy and hematosalpinx (marked by red arrows). The right tube is normal.
- Specialty: Urology
- Frequency: 1.08% to 1.8%

Hematosalpinx (sometimes also hemosalpinx) is a medical condition involving bleeding into the fallopian tubes.

== Symptoms ==
A hematosalpinx from a tubal pregnancy may be associated with abdominal pain and uterine bleeding. A hematosalpinx from other conditions may be painless but could lead to uterine bleeding.

== Causes ==
A number of causes may account for a hematosalpinx, by far the most common being a ectopic pregnancy. Blood may also escape into the peritoneal cavity leading to a hemoperitoneum. A hematosalpinx can also be associated with endometriosis, tubal carcinoma, and pelvic inflammatory disease. Further, if menstrual blood flow is obstructed (cryptomenorrhea), caused for instance by a transverse vaginal septum, and gets backed up it may lead to a hematosalpinx.

== Diagnosis ==
Diagnosis may include, but is not limited to, gynecologic ultrasound, CT scan, and MRI. Estimated incidence ranges from 1.08% to 1.8% for this rare condition.

== Treatment ==
Prompt surgical intervention by laparoscopy is used to remove the impacted fallopian tube. Postoperative recovery suggest anti-inflammatory and enzyme resorption therapy.

== See also ==
- Hydrosalpinx
