= Reproductive system disease =

Disease of the human reproductive system

A reproductive system disease is any disease of the human reproductive system.

== Types ==
=== Infections ===
Reproductive tract infection (RTI) are infections that affects the reproductive tract, which is part of the reproductive system. For females, reproductive tract infections can affect the upper reproductive tract (fallopian tubes, ovary and uterus) and the lower reproductive tract (vagina, cervix and vulva); for males these infections affect the penis, testicles, urethra or the vas deferens. The three types of reproductive tract infections are endogenous infections, iatrogenic infections, and the more commonly known sexually transmitted infections. Each has its own specific causes and symptoms, caused by a bacterium, virus, fungus, or other organism. Some infections are easily treatable and can be cured, some are more difficult, and some are non-curable, such as AIDS and herpes.

=== Congenital abnormalities ===
Examples of congenital abnormalities of the reproductive system include:

- Kallmann syndrome - Genetic disorder causing decreased functioning of the sex hormone-producing glands caused by a deficiency of one or both testes from the scrotum.
- Androgen insensitivity syndrome - A genetic disorder causing people who are genetically male (i.e., XY chromosome pair) to develop sexually as a female due to an inability to utilize androgen.
- Intersexuality - A person who has genitalia and/or other sexual traits which are not clearly male or female.

=== Examples of cancers ===
Examples of cancers of the reproductive system include:

- Benign prostatic hyperplasia
- Breast cancer - Cancer of the mammary gland
- Cervical cancer - Cancer of the cervix
- Ovarian cancer - Cancer of the ovary
- Penile cancer - Cancer of the penis
- Prostate cancer - Cancer of the prostate gland
- Uterine cancer - Cancer of the uterus
- Testicular cancer - Cancer of the testicle
- Vulvar cancer - Cancer of the vulva

=== Examples of functional problems ===
Examples of functional problems of the reproductive system include:

- Impotence - The inability of a male to produce or maintain an erection.
- Hypogonadism - A lack of function of the gonads, in regard to either hormones or gamete production.
- Ectopic pregnancy - When a fertilized ovum is implanted in any tissue other than the uterine wall.
- Female sexual arousal disorder - A condition of decreased, insufficient, or absent lubrication in females during sexual activity
- Premature ejaculation - A lack of voluntary control over ejaculation.
- Dysmenorrhea - Is a medical condition of pain during menstruation that interferes with daily activities

=== Endocrine ===
It is also known that disruption of the endocrine system by certain chemicals adversely affects the development of the reproductive system and can cause vaginal cancer. Many other reproductive diseases have also been linked to exposure to synthetic and environmental chemicals. Common chemicals with known links to reproductive disorders include: lead, dioxins and dioxin-like compounds, styrene, toluene, BPA (Bisphenol A) and pesticides.
