= Hematocolpos =

Accumulation of menstrual blood within the vagina due to blockage

- Specialty: Gynecology

Hematocolpos is a medical condition in which the vagina is pooled with menstrual blood due to multiple factors leading to the blockage of menstrual blood flow. The medical definition of hematocolpos is "an accumulation of blood within the vagina". It is often caused by the combination of menstruation with an imperforate hymen. It is sometimes seen in Robinow syndrome, uterus didelphys, or other vaginal anomalies.

A related disorder is hematometra, where the uterus fills with menstrual blood. It presents after puberty as primary amenorrhea, recurrent pelvic pain with a pelvic mass. This can be caused by a congenital stenosis of the cervix, or by a complication of a surgical treatment. Mucometrocolpos is the accumulation of mucous secretions behind an imperforate hymen. Mucometrocolpos can sometimes cause abdominal distention.

== Symptoms ==
Signs and symptoms include:

- On and off lower abdominal pain lasting more than a week
- Pain with cramping, with episodes of worse pain in between
- Vomiting without blood or bile
- Abdominal bloating and distention
- Constipation and changes in urine output
- Tender breasts or pain in the breasts
- Vaginal bleeding or discharge
- Severe cyclic pelvic pain
- Urinary retention

== Causes ==
There are four possible causes of hematocolpos

- Imperforate hymen: An imperforate hymen is a medical condition where the female is born with a hymen that spans the entire diameter of the vagina, with no opening to the outside. An imperforate hymen may be diagnosed at any age. However, when a girl hits puberty, this type of hymen blocks the blood from flowing out and the blood pools in the vagina. This may cause a sensation of 'mass' or fullness in the lower abdomen, pain in the stomach and back, along with problems with urinating and bowel movements. Chemical exposure of the vaginal epithelia may lead to tissue damage (up to and including necrosis) and swelling (edema). The edematous blockage of the vagina results in identical symptomatology as the imperforate hymen.
- Cervical atresia is a relatively rare Müllerian duct anomaly of the female reproductive tract. It is associated with acute or chronic pain in the abdomen or pelvic pain along with other reproductive problems. A significant share of the women with cervical atresia have it since birth, that is, congenital cervical atresia. However, cervical atresia is distinct from other Müllerian duct anomalies.
- Vaginal atresia: Vaginal atresia is another congenital defect which results in the uterovaginal outflow tract obstruction. it occurs when the caudal portion of the vagina fails to form and is rather replaced with fibrous tissues only. Vaginal atresia has three basic categories of anomalies- vaginal agenesis, ambiguous genitalia, and imperforate anus and urogenital sinus variants. The different features associated with an ambiguous genitalia which might eventually lead to a blockage of menstrual blood flow are: i) Rugal folds over the labia ii) Mass in an apparent labium iii) Excess clitoral tissue. Due to these anomalies, there are chances that the menstrual blood would not be able to flow out of the vagina, eventually leading to hematocolpos.
- Transverse vaginal septum: A transverse vaginal septum is another medical condition whereby an extra horizontal wall of tissue that has formed during embryological development creates a blockage in the vagina. Transverse vaginal septa are relatively rare anomalies, occurring in about 1 in 70,000 girls. The diagnosis can be made at various ages, from neonates presenting with hydrocolpos to young women presenting with primary amenorrhea and pelvic pain due to the development of hematocolpos. Often, women might have a normal hymeneal opening but this wall of tissue might be blocking the access to the vaginal canal. A small opening in the septum called the fenestration allows the menstrual blood to flow out of the vagina. However, it takes longer than the usual menstrual cycle. For the women who do not have a fenestration, blood will pool in the upper vagina and this would lead to serious abdominal pain. This also results in infertility.

== Treatment ==
As the causes for Hematocolpos are diverse, there are different surgical treatments which needs to be undertaken to cure it. Surgical interventions for congenital cervical atresia range from complete hysterectomy with canalization to conservative options, such as uterine cavity catheterization.

For the women who have an imperforate hymen, a minor surgery is required incising the extra hymen membrane. It is generally treated surgically, with a hymenotomy or other surgery to remove any tissue that blocks the menstrual flow. Also, post surgery, the patient is required to insert dilators into the vagina for a few minutes each day for a few days post the surgery to avoid the incision being closed on its own. Once the patient has recovered from the surgery- that is, there are no burning sensation around the vaginal, they can have regular periods, normal sexual intercourse. Unlike an imperforate hymen which can be easily corrected, surgical correction of a transverse septum can be difficult if the surgery is not carefully planned. Postoperative complications, such as vaginal stenosis and re-obstruction can occur, especially when the septum is thick. The thickness and location of the septum is most commonly evaluated by transperineal ultrasound or MRI before attempting its resection.
