= VACTERL association =

- Other names: VATER association, VATER syndrome, VACTERL syndrome
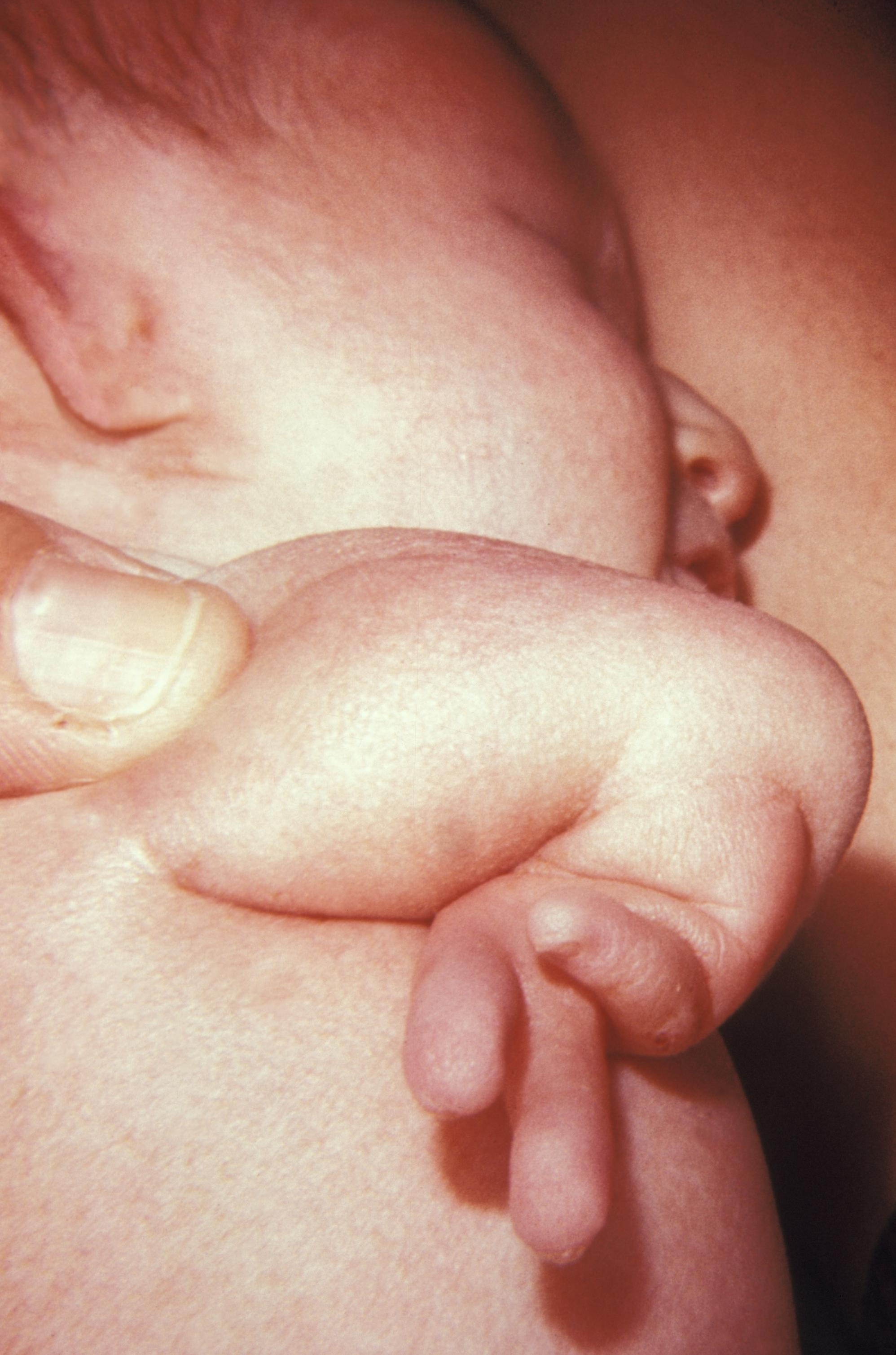
- Newborn with radial aplasia of the right arm, is displaying a limb anomaly included in VACTERL association
- Specialty: Medical genetics
- Treatment: surgical repair

The VACTERL association (also VATER association, and less accurately VACTERL syndrome) refers to a recognized group of birth defects which tend to co-occur (see below). This pattern is a recognized association, as opposed to a syndrome, because there is no known pathogenetic cause to explain the grouped incidence.

Each child with this condition can be unique. At present this condition is treated after birth with issues being approached one at a time. Some infants are born with symptoms that cannot be treated and they do not survive. VACTERL association can be linked to other similar conditions such as Klippel–Feil and Goldenhar syndrome including crossovers of conditions.

No specific genetic or chromosome problem has been identified with VACTERL association. VACTERL can be seen with some chromosomal defects such as Trisomy 18 and is more frequently seen in babies of diabetic mothers. VACTERL association, however, is most likely caused by multiple factors.

VACTERL association specifically refers to the abnormalities in structures derived from the embryonic mesoderm.

== Signs and symptoms ==
The following features are observed with VACTERL association:

- V – Vertebral anomalies
- A – Anorectal malformations
- C – Cardiovascular anomalies
- T – Tracheoesophageal fistula
- E – Esophageal atresia
- R – Renal (Kidney) and/or radial anomalies
- L – Limb defects

Although it was not conclusive whether VACTERL should be defined by at least two or three component defects, it is typically defined by the presence of at least three of the above congenital malformations.

=== Spine ===
Vertebral anomalies, or defects of the spinal column, usually consist of small (hypoplastic) vertebrae, butterfly vertebrae, or hemivertebra where only one half of the bone is formed. About 80 percent of patients with VACTERL association will have vertebral anomalies. In early life these rarely cause any difficulties, although the presence of these defects on a chest x-ray may alert the physician to other defects associated with VACTERL. Later in life, these spinal column abnormalities may put the child at risk for developing scoliosis, or curvature of the spine.

=== Anorectal defects ===
Anal atresia, such as imperforate anus and anal atresia, are seen in about 55 to 90 percent of patients with VACTERL association. These anomalies are usually noted at birth. Anorectal defects often require surgery in the first days of life. Sometimes infants will require several surgeries to fully reconstruct the intestine or rectum.

=== Cardiac defects ===
Approximately 40-80 percent of patients with VACTERL association have been reported to have congenital heart disease. The most common heart defects seen with VACTERL association are ventricular septal defect (VSD), atrial septal defects and tetralogy of Fallot. Less common defects are truncus arteriosus and transposition of the great arteries. It is subsequently thought that cardiac defects should be considered an extension of VACTERL.

=== Trachea and esophagus ===
Esophageal atresia with tracheoesophageal fistula (TEF or TOF) is seen in about 70 percent of patients with VACTERL association, although it can frequently occur as an isolated defect. 15-33% of patients with TOF will also have congenital heart disease. However these babies usually have uncomplicated heart defects, like a ventricular septal defect, which may not require any surgery.

=== Kidneys ===
Kidney defects are seen in approximately 50 percent of patients with VACTERL association. In addition, up to 35 percent of patients with VACTERL association have a single umbilical artery (there are usually two arteries and one vein) which is often associated with additional kidney or urologic problems. Renal abnormalities in VACTERL association can be severe, with incomplete formation of one or both kidneys or urologic abnormalities such as obstruction of outflow of urine from the kidneys or severe reflux (backflow) of urine into the kidneys from the bladder. These problems can cause kidney failure early in life and may require kidney transplant. Many of these problems can be corrected surgically before any damage can occur.

=== Limbs ===
Limb defects occur in up to 70 percent of babies with VACTERL association and include a displaced or hypoplastic thumb, extra digits (polydactyly), fusion of digits (syndactyly) and forearm defects such as radial aplasia. Babies with limb defects on both sides tend to have kidney or urologic defects on both sides, while babies with limb defects on only one side of the body tend to have kidney problems on that same side.

=== Extension ===
Features secondary to VACTERL components are frequent enough to be considered an extension of VACTERL. These include: single umbilical artery, ambiguous genitalia, abdominal wall defects, diaphragmatic hernia, intestinal and respiratory anomalies, and oligohydramnios sequence defects. Cardiac defects are thought to fit in this category.

=== Growth ===
Many babies with VACTERL are born small and have difficulty with gaining weight. Babies with VACTERL association, however, do tend to have normal development and normal intelligence.

== Pathology ==
Patients with abnormal cardiac and kidney function may be more at risk for hemolytic uremic syndrome.

== Diagnosis ==
VACTERL association currently has no known genetic cause. As numerous other conditions may present with similar defects, it is important for genetic testing to be conducted as soon as possible. Testing may be done via chorionic villus sampling or amniocentesis if defects are discovered during prenatal ultrasounds, or by blood after birth. VACTERL diagnosis is only made when genetic test results indicate there are no identifiable genetic or chromosomal abnormalities.

=== Differential diagnosis ===
- Baller–Gerold syndrome
- CHARGE syndrome
- Currarino syndrome
- DiGeorge syndrome
- Fanconi anemia
- Feingold syndrome
- Fryns syndrome
- MURCS association
- Oculo-auriculo-vertebral syndrome
- Opitz G/BBB syndrome
- Holt–Oram syndrome
- Pallister–Hall syndrome
- Townes–Brocks syndrome
- VACTERL with hydrocephalus

== Epidemiology ==
The incidence of VACTERL association is estimated to be approximately 1 in 10,000 to 1 in 40,000 live births. Several case reports indicate factors such as maternal diabetes, a lack of adequate prenatal folic acid intake, and smoking as potentially related to the development of VACTERL association. While most cases of VACTERL are sporadic, there are rare instances of familial cases.

Occasionally in conjoined twinning, one twin is a stillbirth who shows additional features within VACTERL association, such as cystic hygroma (notably in the neck/Hygroma colli), hydrocephalus, and cleft lip or palate. Most doctors usually claim the underdeveloped twin as a parasite, in which has a pulseless heart that might receive all blood flow from the autosite or host twin.

== History ==
The acronym VATER association was first described by Linda Quan, an emergency room physician, and David Smith, who was considered the "father of dysmorphology", in 1972, to define a non-random co-occurrence of the listed defects. Years later, research revealed that cardiac and renal abnormalities were common in the association, and the acronym was changed to VACTERL. VACTERL is considered an "association" instead of a "syndrome" as there has not been a common causal link found for the group of defects.

== See also ==
- 22q11 deletion syndrome
- Absent radius
