= MURCS association =

- Other names: Müllerian duct aplasia-renal dysplasia-cervical somite anomalies syndrome
- This condition can be inherited in an autosomal dominant manner(though not always)
- Specialty: Medical genetics

MURCS association (or type 2 Mayer-Rokitansky-Küster-Hauser syndrome) is a very rare developmental disorder that primarily affects the reproductive and urinary systems involving MUllerian agenesis, Renal agenesis, Cervicothoracic Somite abnormalities. It affects only females.

== Signs and symptoms ==
Mayer–Rokitansky–Küster–Hauser (MRKH) syndrome type 2 is characterized by congenital uterovaginal agenesis associated with a variable spectrum of extragenital anomalies. Affected individuals typically have a normal female karyotype (46,XX), preserved ovarian function, and normal development of secondary sexual characteristics. The gynecological presentation most commonly includes primary amenorrhea due to absence of the uterus and the upper two-thirds of the vagina, often identified during adolescence or early adulthood.

Extravaginal manifestations distinguish type 2 (atypical) MRKH and may involve multiple organ systems. Renal anomalies are among the most frequent findings and include pelvic kidneys, horseshoe kidney, or renal agenesis. Skeletal abnormalities are also common and may present as vertebral fusion, scoliosis, butterfly vertebrae, or cervical ribs, reflecting disruptions in axial skeletal development. Additional reported anomalies include gastrointestinal malformations such as annular pancreas and rare hepatic variants, such as castor tail-like liver.

Cardiovascular involvement, although less frequent, can be clinically significant. Congenital heart defects such as atrial septal defects may remain undiagnosed until adulthood and can manifest with progressive dyspnea, palpitations, peripheral cyanosis, pulmonary hypertension, or cerebrovascular events secondary to paradoxical embolism. Symptoms may be insidious and attributed to other conditions, contributing to delayed diagnosis.

The clinical presentation of MRKH type 2 is therefore heterogeneous and depends on the number and severity of associated malformations. This variability underscores the importance of systematic multisystem evaluation in individuals diagnosed with MRKH to allow early detection and management of potentially serious associated anomalies.

== Genetics ==
Genetic heterogeneity is observed in MURCS association.

== Diagnosis ==
Examination	Typical findings
Physical examination including a precautious pelvic exam by an experienced pediatric/adolescent gynecologist.	Normal height, secondary sex characteristics, and hair growth. Normal external genitalia. Short blind-ending vagina (0–3 cm) with no cervix at the apex. No uterus detected by manual palpation.
Radiologic examination
US of internal genitalia (transvaginal/−perineal)^{a}	No uterus or vaginal canal. Two functional ovaries.
Pelvic MRI scan	Confirms the diagnosis. Determines the presence of rudimentary uterine buds or complete uterovaginal agenesis
Renal scan (by US or MRI)	Renal abnormalities are found in approximately 30% of patients
Consider examinations for other associated malformations (e.g. EOS scan, otorhinopharyngeal assessment and echocardiography	Various skeletal malformations (axis and limbs), hearing impairment and congenital heart defects (rare).
Biochemical analysis
Gonadotropins (FSH, LH)	Normal levels following menstrual cycle
Estradiol	Normal levels
Androgen status	Normal female levels
Chromosomal analysis (can be used to differentiate from 46,XY DSDs)	46,XX

1. Abbreviations: FSH follicle stimulating hormone, LH luteinizing hormone, MRI magnetic resonance imaging, US ultrasonography
2. ^{a}Transabdominal US should be considered in younger patients.

== Treatment ==
Management of vaginal agenesis: correction of vaginal agenesis in MRKH syndrome with creation of a functional neovagina has been a hallmark in the treatment. Various different surgical and non-surgical methods have been suggested for vaginal construction.

Infertility and uterus transplantation (UTx): Uterus transplantation (UTx) has now emerged as the first true infertility treatment for women with MRKH syndrome and giving them full (gestational, genetic, legal) motherhood from start.
