= Radial aplasia =

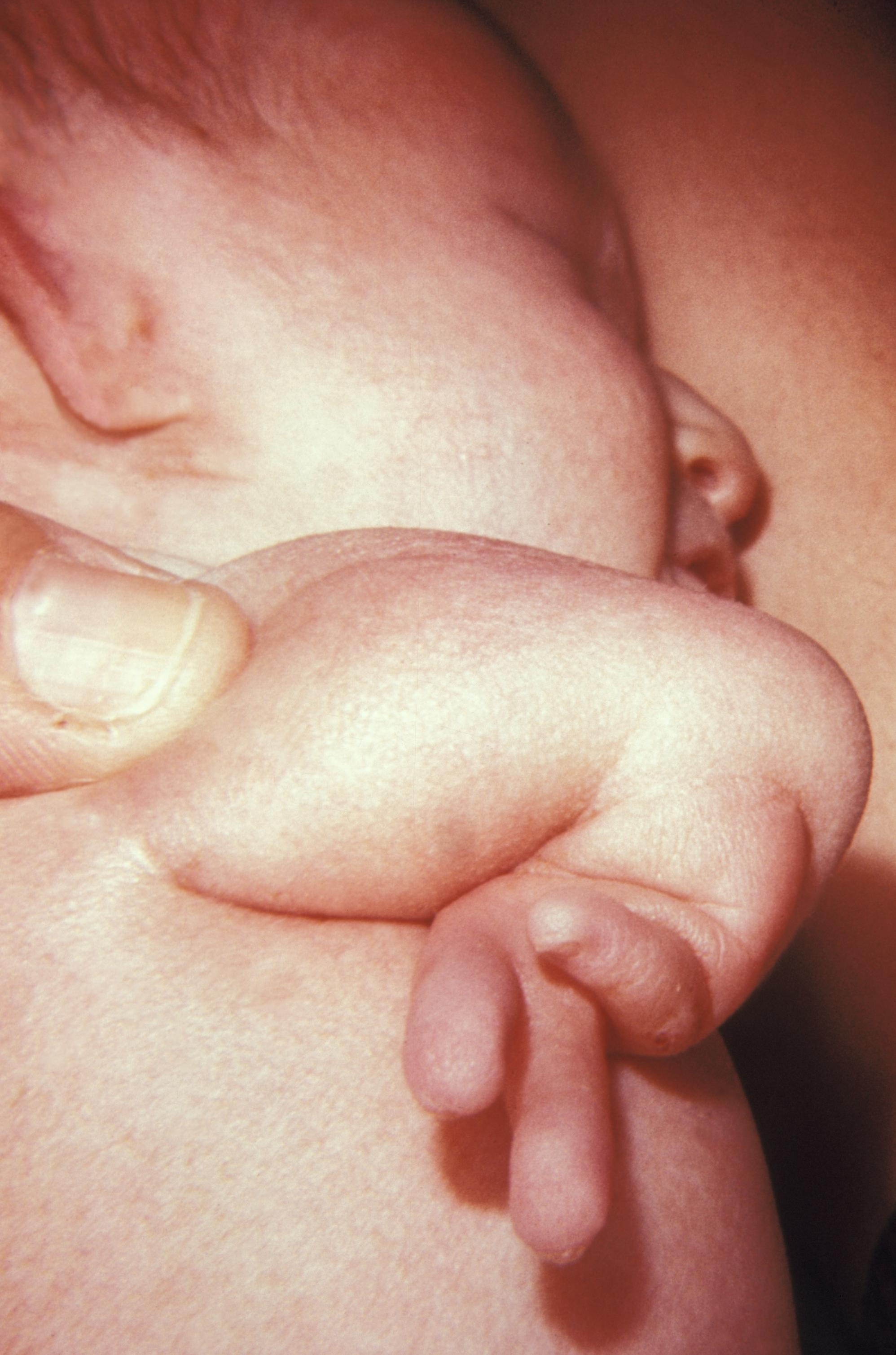
- Newborn with radial aplasia of the right arm
- Specialty: Orthopedic

Radial aplasia is a congenital defect which affects the formation of the radius bone in the arm. The radius is the lateral bone (thumb side) which connects the humerus of the upper arm to the wrist via articulation with the carpal bones. A child born with this condition has either a short or absent radius bone in one or both of their arms. Radial aplasia also results in the thumb being either partly formed or completely absent from the hand, which can result in difficulties performing activities of daily living. Radial aplasia is connected with the condition VACTERL association, under the 'L' for limb malformations.

Radial aplasia is not inherited. The cause for radial aplasia is unknown, but is widely believed to occur within the first ten weeks of gestation. The incidence is reported to be between 1 in 30,000 and 1 in 100,000 live births, bilateral in half, slightly more common in boys than girls. Most cases are sporadic, with only about 20% familial.
