= August Franz Josef Karl Mayer =

German anatomist and physiologist (1787–1865)

- Born: 2 November 1787; Schwäbisch Gmünd, Kingdom of Württemberg, Holy Roman Empire
- Died: 9 November 1865 (aged 78); Bonn, Rhine Province, Kingdom of Prussia, German Confederation
- Education: University of Tübingen(doctorate 1812)
- Known for: Mayer–Rokitansky–Küster–Hauser syndrome
- Scientific career
- Fields: Physiology
- Workplaces: Academy of Bern, University of Bonn
- Notable students: Johannes Peter Müller, Theodor Ludwig Wilhelm von Bischoff

August Franz Josef Karl Mayer (2 November 1787 in Schwäbisch Gmünd – 9 November 1865 in Bonn) was a German anatomist and physiologist.

He received his education at the University of Tübingen, obtaining his doctorate in 1812. Afterwards, he worked as a prosector at the Academy of Bern, where in 1815 he was named a professor of anatomy and physiology. From 1819 to 1856 he was a professor at the University of Bonn. Among his better known students at Bonn were Johannes Peter Müller and Theodor Ludwig Wilhelm von Bischoff.

His name is associated with a female reproductive disorder known today as Mayer–Rokitansky–Küster–Hauser syndrome (MRKH); named in conjunction with Carl von Rokitansky, Hermann Küster and Georges André Hauser.

== Selected works ==
He was the author of around 145 published works, many of them written from the viewpoint of natural philosophy.

- Ueber Histologie und eine neue Eintheilung der Gewebe des menschlichen Körpers, 1819 – On histology and a new division of tissues of the human body.
- Beschreibung einer graviditas interstitialis uteri, 1825.
- Supplemente zur Biologie des Blutes und des Pflanzensaftes, Book 1, 1827 – Supplements on the biology of the blood and of plant sap.
- Über Verdoppelungen des Uterus und ihre Arten, nebst Bemerkungen über Harenscharte und Wolfsrachen, 1829.
- Supplemente zur Lehre vom Kreislaufe, 1827 - Volume 1, 1835 – Supplements to the doctrine of circulation.
- Flimmerbewegungen, Leben der Blutsphären, Monadenlehre: 2, 1836.
- Die Metamorphose der Monaden, 1840 – The metamorphosis of monads.
- Beiträge zur anatomie der entozoen, 1841 – Contributions to the anatomy of Entozoa.
- Anatomische Untersuchungen über das Auge vom Walfisch, 1853 – Anatomical investigations on the eye of the whale.
- Ueber die Struktur der Häutedeckungen der Cetaceen, 1855 – On the structure of cetacean skin.
- Zur Anatomie des Orang-Utang und des Chimpanse, 1856 – On the anatomy of the orang-utan and the chimpanzee
- Ueber die fossilen Ueberreste eines menschlichen Schädels und Skeletes in einer Felsenhöhle des Düssel- oder Neander-Thales, 1864 – Concerning the fossil remains of a human skull and skeleton in a cave of the Düssel or Neander valley.
