= WNT4 deficiency =

Genetic disorder

WNT4 deficiency is a rare genetic disorder that affects females and it results in the underdevelopment and sometimes absence of the uterus and vagina. WNT4 deficiency is caused by mutations of the WNT4 gene. Abnormally high androgen levels are found in the blood and can initiate and promote the development of male sex characteristics. This is seen as male pattern of hair growth on the chest and face. Those with this genetic defect develop breasts but do not have their period. Mayer–Rokitansky–Küster–Hauser syndrome is a related but distinct syndrome. Some women who have an initial diagnosis of MRKH have later been found to have WNT4 deficiency. Most women with MRKH syndrome do not have genetic mutations of the WNT4 gene. The failure to begin the menstrual cycle may be the initial clinical sign of WNT4 deficiency. WNT4 deficiency can cause significant psychological challenges and counseling is recommended.

== Signs and symptoms ==
The case reports for WNT4 deficiency are few and far between making it difficult to assess the full list of signs and symptoms. More cases ought to be identified in order to achieve a better, and well-rounded, potential spectrum of associated symptoms. However, from the cases that have been identified and given the mechanism of action, there have been symptoms that have been characterized to explain WNT4 deficiency.

- Failure to begin menstrual cycles (amenorrhea)
- Ambiguous genitalia (short vagina, severely underdeveloped/absent uterus) but normal pubertal characteristics such as breast development and pubic hair
- Infertile
- Difficulty in attempting sexual intercourse
- Pain during intercourse
- Abnormally high levels of androgens in the blood (hyperandrogenism)
- May develop acne and male pattern of hair growth including hair on the face/chest (hirsutism)
- Susceptible to urinary tract infections and/or kidney stones

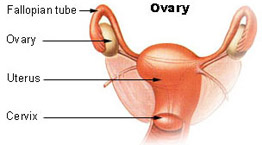
Ovary, the female reproductive organ.

== Causes ==
WNT4 deficiency is an extremely rare disorder that affects females. The exact cause is still unknown due to very limited presented cases worldwide. However, what is known is that it is caused by mutations in the WNT4 gene. WNT4 is a secreted protein that is encoded by the WNT4 gene which is found on chromosome 1. The main function of this gene is to promote female sex development and repress male sex development. The WNT4 gene provides instructions for producing a specific protein that is responsible for the formation of the female reproductive system, the kidneys, and several hormone producing glands.

The WNT4 protein is important in regulating the formation of the Müllerian ducts, also known as the paramesonephric duct, which are the structures in the embryo that eventually will develop into the uterus, fallopian tubes, cervix, and the upper part of the vagina. Consequently, this protein is essential in development of the ovaries and development of oocytes, or female egg cells.

As said, this disorder can be caused by a mutation in the gene due to a random spontaneous event, or it can be inherited as an autosomal dominant trait. Dominant genetic disorders occur when only a single copy of an abnormal gene is necessary to portray its phenotypic qualities. Based on the laws of normal genetics, the abnormal gene can be inherited from either parent and the risk of passing the gene from affected parent to future offspring is 50% regardless of the sex of the offspring given its dominant properties. However, in this case it is not possible to inherit the gene from a mother because they are infertile therefore meaning that they cannot have children. It is still unknown if this mutation can be inherited from the father or if it is caused by new mutations in the gene.

== Mechanism/pathophysiology ==
Human Chromosome 1

WNT4 is a secreted protein that is encoded by the WNT4 gene which is found on chromosome 1. Investigators have found that the gene is located on the short arm (p) of chromosome one, which is denoted as (1p35). 1 denotes the chromosome number, p denotes the arm, and 35 denotes the band that the mutation is located on the chromosome. The exact functions of the protein of the WNT4 gene are not fully understood and more research ought to be obtained in order to determine the underlying mechanism of action that causes the symptoms associated with this disease.

However, what is known is that WNT4 is a secreted molecule that binds to the members of the frizzled family of receptors which results in the transcriptional regulation of target genes. Frizzled is a family of atypical G protein-coupled receptors that serve as receptors in the Wnt signaling pathway and other signaling pathways. WNT4 is produced in the ovarian somatic cells and it up-regulates the Dax1 gene known to aggravate the nuclear-receptor steroidogenic factor1 which ultimately will inhibit steroidogenic enzymes. WNT4 increases follistatin expression which ultimately inhibits the formation of anti-testis action and supports ovarian germ cell survival.

== Diagnosis ==
WNT4 deficiency is present at birth meaning that it is congenital, but can be left undiagnosed or unidentified until adolescence when female puberty begins. The start of the females menstrual cycle commences her puberty years, however primary amenorrhea or lack of menstruation, may be what brought a patient in to see a physician and that is when diagnosis begins. Due to this condition being extremely rare, a diagnosis of WNT4 deficiency may be suspected only after having done extensive clinical evaluation, detailed patient history, and the identification of characteristic symptoms. These symptoms include an absent or underdeveloped uterus and/or vagina occurring in conjunction with normal external genitalia.

Specialized imaging techniques such as ultrasounds or magnetic resonance imaging (MRI) can be used to see images of the internal organs (uterus, ovaries, and kidney) to further confirm WNT4 deficiency. In addition, due to modern science, molecular genetic analysis can reveal any mutations of the WNT4 gene to confirm this diagnosis. Karyotyping can be performed as well to rule out any other conditions because it examines the integrity of chromosome in a sample of cells. A female presenting with WNT4 deficiency will have a normal 46, XX karyotype, however, abnormalities on those chromosomes can be seen.

=== Related disorders / common misdiagnoses ===
WNT4 deficiency can sometimes be misdiagnosed because there are other disorders that elicit very similar symptoms. One other rare disorder is known as Mayer-Rokitansky-Kuster-Hauser (MRKH) syndrome. It is said that women who have WNT4 deficiency have been misdiagnosed with MRKH syndrome due to very similar signs and symptoms, however, the main difference is that in MRKH syndrome, there is no mutation present on the WNT4 gene even though there is an underdevelopment of the uterus/vagina and amenorrhea while still maintaining normal ovarian function. MRKH syndrome is typically the first diagnosis given, but upon extensive genetic testing and imaging analysis, WNT4 deficiency is the correct diagnosis.

Additionally, complete androgen insensitivity syndrome is a rare disorder in which individuals are genetically male (46, XY) but they do not respond to androgens. This syndrome demonstrates intersex because phenotypically the person is female and displays all external phenotypes of a female, but genetically male because their karyotype denotes 46, XY.

== Prevention/treatment ==
Since WNT4 is a congenital disease, and it is autosomal dominantly inherited, there is no prevention. Since one of the main signs of WNT4 deficiency is having an absent uterus, conceiving is not an option. However, other forms of conception may be available to them since they have functional ovaries but since this disease has an autosomal dominant pattern of inheritance, genetic testing might be a suggestion in order to prevent the passing of the gene.

Treatment, on the other hand, is still in the works considering there are not many cases reported and of those cases, severity of diagnosis differs. However, generally speaking based on what is known, treatment of WNT4 deficiency is directed toward specific symptoms that are apparent in each individual meaning that they arise on a case by case basis. Nonetheless, treatment will require efforts from a team of specialists such as pediatricians (given a diagnosis under age 18), internists, gynecologists, nephrologists, endocrinologists, plastic surgeons, urologists, psychiatrists, and more.

- Counseling
- Genetic Testing
- Antibiotics to help treat recurrent, and frequent UTI's
- Non-Surgical techniques such as vaginal dilators to increase the depth of the vagina to a normal length. This would ease the pain and difficulty associated with sexual intercourse.
  - Franck's Dilator Method - a physician and then the woman herself applies the vaginal dilator for up to 6 weeks to several months to stretch the walls of the vagina to widen and potentially elongate.
- Plastic Surgery
  - Vaginoplasty is a surgery performed to create an artificial vagina

== Prognosis ==
Due to how rare this disorder is, evidence on prognosis is not yet identified. However, based on what is known, a woman who is diagnosed with WNT4 deficiency may have the potential to live a long life. However, this diagnosis does lead to infertility, difficulty engaging in intercourse, the reoccurrence of kidney stones, etc. which may mean preserving a good quality of life may be difficult. Therefore, difficulty accepting this diagnosis may require extensive counseling and group therapy in order to accept and adapt to a different lifestyle.

== Epidemiology ==
WNT4 deficiency does not have any concrete evidence of epidemiology due to its rare nature. The most concrete evidence that is identified lies in the hands of genetics due to its autosomal dominant pattern of inheritance and the mutation present on chromosome 1. However, there is no evidence to show population favorability, distribution patterns, risk factors, environmental factors, etc.

== Current research/research directions ==
WNT4 deficiency is an extremely rare genetic disorder and not much research can be found in relation to the disease itself. The knowledge behind the gene and how it acts in the body is present however, with such minimal cases to compare to, it is hard to develop research on the disease. A future perspective to consider, on the other hand, regarding the WNT4 gene can be used to evaluate conditions such as polyendocrine metabolic ovarian syndrome (PMOS) which is a very common disease that affects many females. PCOS also displays hyperandrogenic characteristics and a better characterization of the milder form of WNT4 and its signaling pathways in ovarian tissues can help to further explain its contribution to the hyperandrogenic states seen in patients with PCOS.

Research regarding the WNT4 gene itself is in the works in relation to other conditions that stem from the properties related to this gene. That being said, although this disorder is extremely rare, the WNT4 gene is very widely used in other biological functions. For instance, in 2016, a group of researchers studied how the WNT4 gene mediates estrogen receptor signaling and endocrine resistance in invasive lobular carcinoma cell lines. Since WNT4 is a critical signaling molecule in mammary gland development regulated by a progesterone receptor, its pathway was used in breast cancer research in order to modulate the endocrine response in invasive lobular carcinoma. Additionally, WNT4 gene is used in research regarding kidney function. In 2013, DiRocco et al. published a research article regarding WNT4 and beta-catenin signaling in medullary kidney fibroblasts and discovered that WNT4 expression in renal fibrosis is important in the proliferation process.
