= Mucometrocolpos =

Mucometrocolpos is the abnormal accumulation of genital secretions (mucus) that occur as a result of an imperforate hymen and the buildup of these secretions behind the hymen. The secretions originate from uterine and cervical glands. It is a rare, congenital condition and usually occurs independent of other abnormal structures though inheritance can play a part in its occurrence. It also occurs with McKusick–Kaufman syndrome (MKS). Polydactyly and heart disease are associated with this condition. Diagnosis is challenging because symptoms also occur in a variety of other syndromes. Secretions can build up and extend as far as the uterus and abdomen. Mucometrocolpos can sometimes cause abdominal distention. The build up of mucous secretions can occur prior to adolescence unrelated to menstruation. Many cases can be detected prenatally. Treatment is surgical and is specific for each case. After treatment, many females are still able to conceive and carry a pregnancy to term.
