= Vaginal adenosis =

Vaginal abnormality

Vaginal adenosis is a benign abnormality in the vagina, commonly thought to be caused by intrauterine and neonatal exposure of diethylstilbestrol and other progestogens and nonsteroidal estrogens, however it has also been observed in otherwise healthy women and has been considered at times idiopathic or congenital. Postpubertal lesions have also been observed to grow de novo. It has a rather common incidence, of about 10% of adult women.

== Causes ==
Vaginal adenosis is characterised by the presence of metaplastic cervical or endometrial epithelium within the vaginal wall, considered as derived from Müllerian epithelium islets in later life. In women who were exposed to certain chemicals, vaginal adenosis may arise in up to 90%. Since these contraceptives were discontinued, incidence has dropped dramatically. Risk is however still present in subsequent generations due to recent exposure.

It is thought steroid hormones play a stimulatory growth in adenosis formation. Vaginal adenosis is also often observed in adenocarcinoma patients.

== Diagnosis ==
Colposcopically, it presents itself similarly to columnar epithelium on the cervix, assisted with lugol's solution application for diagnosis. It can be discovered as nodules or cysts on the vaginal tube, with biopsy needed for further diagnosis. As seen cytologically, epithelial and stromal cells in vaginal adenosis show characteristic fusion through the basal lamina or with stromal fibroblasts. Adenosal cells can be distinguished as mucinous, tuboendometrial, and embryonic. Its mucinous cells resemble the normal cervical lining, while its tuboendometrial cells resemble the lining of normal fallopian tubes or endometrium.

It is sometimes considered a precancerous lesion, given clear-cell adenocarcinoma patients present these lesions near to atypical tuboendometrial glands, and microglandular hyperplasia has been seen to arise from these lesions.
