= Endogenous infection =

In medicine, an endogenous infection is a disease arising from an infectious agent already present in the body but previously asymptomatic.
