= Stenosis of uterine cervix =

Cervical stenosis
- Specialty: Gynecology

Cervical stenosis means that the opening in the cervix (the endocervical canal) is more narrow than is typical. In some cases, the endocervical canal may be completely closed. A stenosis is any passage in the body that is more narrow than it should typically be.

== Signs and symptoms ==
Symptoms depend on whether the cervical canal is partially or completely obstructed and on the patient's menopausal status. Pre-menopausal patients may have a build up of blood inside the uterus which may cause infection, sporadic bleeding, or pelvic pain. Patients also have an increased risk of infertility and endometriosis.

=== Fertility ===
Cervical stenosis may impact natural fertility by impeding the passage of sperm into the uterus. In the context of infertility treatments, cervical stenosis may complicate or prevent the use of intrauterine insemination (IUI) or in vitro fertilization (IVF) procedures.

== Causes ==
Cervical stenosis may be present from birth or may be caused by other factors:

- Surgical procedures performed on the cervix such as colposcopy, cone biopsy, or a cryosurgery procedure
- Trauma to the cervix
- Repeated vaginal infections
- Atrophy of the cervix after menopause
- Cervical cancer
- Radiation
- Cervical nabothian cysts

== Treatment ==
Treatment of cervical stenosis involves opening or widening the cervical canal. The condition may improve on its own following the vaginal delivery of a baby. Cervical canal widening can be temporarily achieved by the insertion of dilators into the cervix. If the stenosis is caused by scar tissue, a laser treatment can be used to vaporize the scarring. Finally, the surgical enlargement of the cervical canal can be performed by hysteroscopic shaving of the cervical tissue.
