= Müllerian agenesis =

Congenital malformation of female reproductive organs

- Other names: Rokitansky–Küster–Hauser syndrome (RKH or RKHS); Müller–Mayer–Rokitansky–Küster–Hauser syndrome; Müllerian aplasia; Vaginal agenesis
- Diagram showing the missing anatomy in Müllerian agenesis
- Specialty: Gynecology
- Symptoms: Missing uterus and variable degrees of vaginal hypoplasia
- Complications: Infertility
- Frequency: 1 in 4,500 females

Müllerian agenesis, also known as vaginal agenesis and Mayer–Rokitansky–Küster–Hauser syndrome (MRKH syndrome), is a birth defect characterized by a failure of the Müllerian ducts to develop, resulting in a missing uterus and variable degrees of underdevelopment of the upper vagina. It is the cause of 15% of primary amenorrhoea. Because most of the vagina does not develop from the Müllerian duct, instead developing from the urogenital sinus, along with the bladder and urethra, it remains present. Because ovaries do not develop from the Müllerian ducts, affected people might have normal secondary sexual characteristics but are infertile due to the lack of a functional uterus. However, biological motherhood is possible through uterus transplantation or use of gestational surrogates.

It is believed to be of autosomal dominant inheritance with incomplete penetrance and variable expressivity, which has made it difficult to determine the underlying mechanisms. It is subdivided into two types: type 1, in which only the structures developing from the Müllerian duct are affected (the upper vagina, cervix, and uterus), and type 2, where the same structures are affected, but other body systems, most often the kidneys and bones, have additional malformations. Type 2 includes MURCS (Müllerian renal cervical somite).

The majority of cases are sporadic, but familial cases have provided evidence that, at least for some, it is an inherited disorder. The underlying causes are being investigated, with several genes possibly associated. Most of these studies have served to rule-out genes as causative factors, but thus far, only WNT4 has been associated with Müllerian agenesis with hyperandrogenism.

Reports of the condition can be traced back to Hippocrates (460–377 BC). The medical eponym honors August Franz Josef Karl Mayer (1787–1865), Carl Freiherr von Rokitansky (1804–1878), Hermann Küster (1879–1964) and Georges Andre Hauser (1921–2009).

== Signs and symptoms ==
A female with this condition is hormonally normal; that is, the woman will enter puberty with development of secondary sexual characteristics including thelarche (breast development) and pubarche (pubic hair). The woman's karyotype will be 46,XX. At least one ovary is intact, if not both, and ovulation usually occurs. Typically, the vagina is shortened and intercourse may, in most cases, be difficult and painful. Medical examination supported by gynecologic ultrasonography demonstrates a complete or partial absence of the cervix, uterus, and vagina.

If there is no uterus, a woman with Müllerian agenesis cannot carry a pregnancy without intervention. It is possible for the woman to have genetic offspring by in vitro fertilization (IVF) and surrogacy. Successful uterine transplant has been performed in limited numbers of patients, resulting in several live births, but the technique is not widespread or accessible to many women.

A woman with Müllerian agenesis typically discovers the condition when, during puberty years, the menstrual cycle does not start (primary amenorrhoea). Some find out earlier through surgeries for other conditions, such as a hernia.

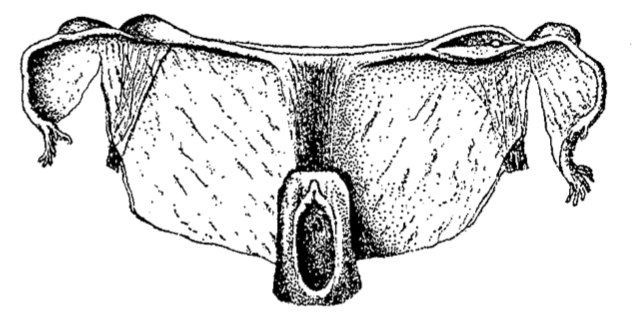
The original illustration by Carl von Rokitansky (1838) showing the uterovaginal morphology in MRKH syndrome with a shortened blind-ending vagina and two rudimentary uterine remnants

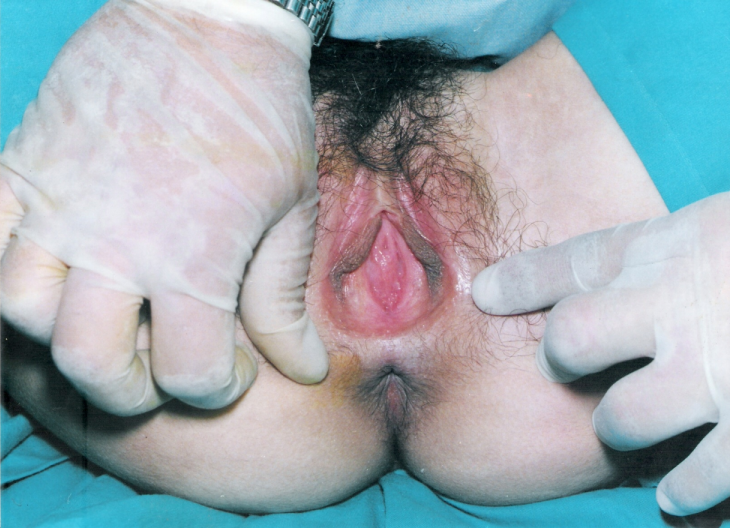
A patient displaying Müllerian agenesis

== Causes ==
The etiology of Müllerian agenesis in many cases remains elusive. However, mutations in a variety of different genes have been implicated in causing MRKH syndrome. The typical and atypical forms of the disorder are presumably caused by mutations in different genes.

WNT4 (found on the short arm (p) of chromosome 1) has been clearly implicated in the atypical version of this disorder. A genetic mutation causes a leucine to proline residue substitution at amino acid position 12. This occurrence reduces the intranuclear levels of β catenin. In addition, it removes the inhibition of steroidogenic enzymes like 3β-hydroxysteriod dehydrogenase and 17α-hydroxylase. Patients therefore have androgen excess. Furthermore, without WNT4, the Müllerian duct is either deformed or absent. Female reproductive organs, such as the cervix, fallopian tubes, and much of the vagina, are hence affected.

An association with 17q12 microdeletion syndrome, a deletion mutation in the long arm (q) of chromosome 17, has been reported. The gene LHX1 is located in this region and may be the cause of a number of these cases.

== Diagnosis ==
=== Classification ===
- Typical Müllerian agenesis – Isolated uterovaginal aplasia/hypoplasia
  - Prevalence – 64%
- Atypical Müllerian agenesis – Uterovaginal aplasia/hypoplasia with renal malformation or uterovaginal aplasia/hypoplasia with ovarian dysfunction
  - Prevalence – 24%
- MURCS syndrome – Uterovaginal aplasia/hypoplasia with renal malformation, skeletal malformation, and cardiac malformation
  - Prevalence – 12%

== Treatment ==
A number of treatments have become available to create a functioning vagina. Standard approaches use vaginal dilators and/or surgery to develop a functioning vagina to allow for penetrative sexual intercourse. As vaginal hypoplasia is not a life-threatening condition, half of MRKH individuals did not receive any treatment in a retrospective study. However, the gene mutations related to MRKH such as HNF1B and GREB1L may also result in anomalies of other systems (especially renal system), so that follow-up examinations for MRKH individuals are recommended regardless of which type of MRKH (Type I or Type II) was diagnosed.

A number of surgical approaches have been used. In the McIndoe procedure, a skin graft is applied to form an artificial vagina. After the surgery, dilators are still necessary to prevent vaginal stenosis. The Vecchietti procedure has been shown to result in a vagina that is comparable to a typical vagina. In the Vecchietti procedure, a small plastic "olive" is threaded against the vaginal area, and the threads are drawn through the vaginal skin, up through the abdomen and navel using laparoscopic surgery. There, the threads are attached to a traction device. The traction device is then tightened daily so the "olive" is pulled inwards and stretches the vagina by approximately 1 cm per day, creating a vagina approximately 7 cm deep in 7 days. The operation takes approximately 45 minutes. Another approach is the use of an autotransplant of a resected sigmoid colon using laparoscopic surgery; results are reported to be very good, with the transplant becoming a functional vagina.

Uterine transplantation has been performed in a number of people with Müllerian agenesis, but the surgery is still in the experimental stage. Since ovaries are present, people with this condition can have genetic children through IVF with embryo transfer to a gestational carrier. Some also choose to adopt.

=== Experimental ===
In 2014, a 36-year-old Swedish woman became the first with a transplanted uterus to give birth to a healthy baby. The mother was born without a uterus, but had functioning ovaries. She and the father used IVF to produce 11 embryos, which were then frozen. Doctors at the University of Gothenburg then performed the uterus transplant, the donor being a 61-year-old family friend. One of the frozen embryos was implanted a year after the transplant, and the baby boy was born prematurely at 31 weeks after the mother developed pre-eclampsia.

As of 2023 more than 100 uterus transplants have taken place with around 50 babies being born worldwide.

==== Laboratory-grown vagina ====
Promising research includes the use of laboratory-grown structures, which are less subject to the complications of non-vaginal tissue, and may be grown using the woman's own cells as a culture source.

A 2014 study and experiment with laboratory-grown engineered vaginas using the patient's own cells resulted in fully functional vaginas capable of menstruation, sustaining penetrative sex, and orgasm in 4 patients, showing promise of fully correcting this condition.

== Epidemiology ==
It is estimated to affect about 1 in 5,000 live female births.

== Society and culture ==
=== People affected ===
- Ben Barres, trans neurobiologist
- Shon Klose, Australian intersex activist and musician
- Esther Morris Leidolf, medical sociologist and intersex activist
- Molly McGlynn, Canadian film director who made the 2023 film Fitting In about her experiences being diagnosed with the condition
- Jaclyn Schultz, Miss Michigan

=== Suspected cases ===
- Amalia of Oldenburg, Queen of Greece According to some reports, Queen Amalia of Greece may have had the syndrome, but a 2011 review of the historical evidence concludes that it is not possible to determine the inability of her and her husband to have a child. Their inability to conceive a heir contributed to the overthrow of the king King Otto.

== See also ==
- MURCS association
- Cervical agenesis
- WNT4 deficiency
- SERKAL syndrome
- Regenerative medicine
