= Imperforate hymen =

Birth defect in which the hymen completely obstructs the vagina

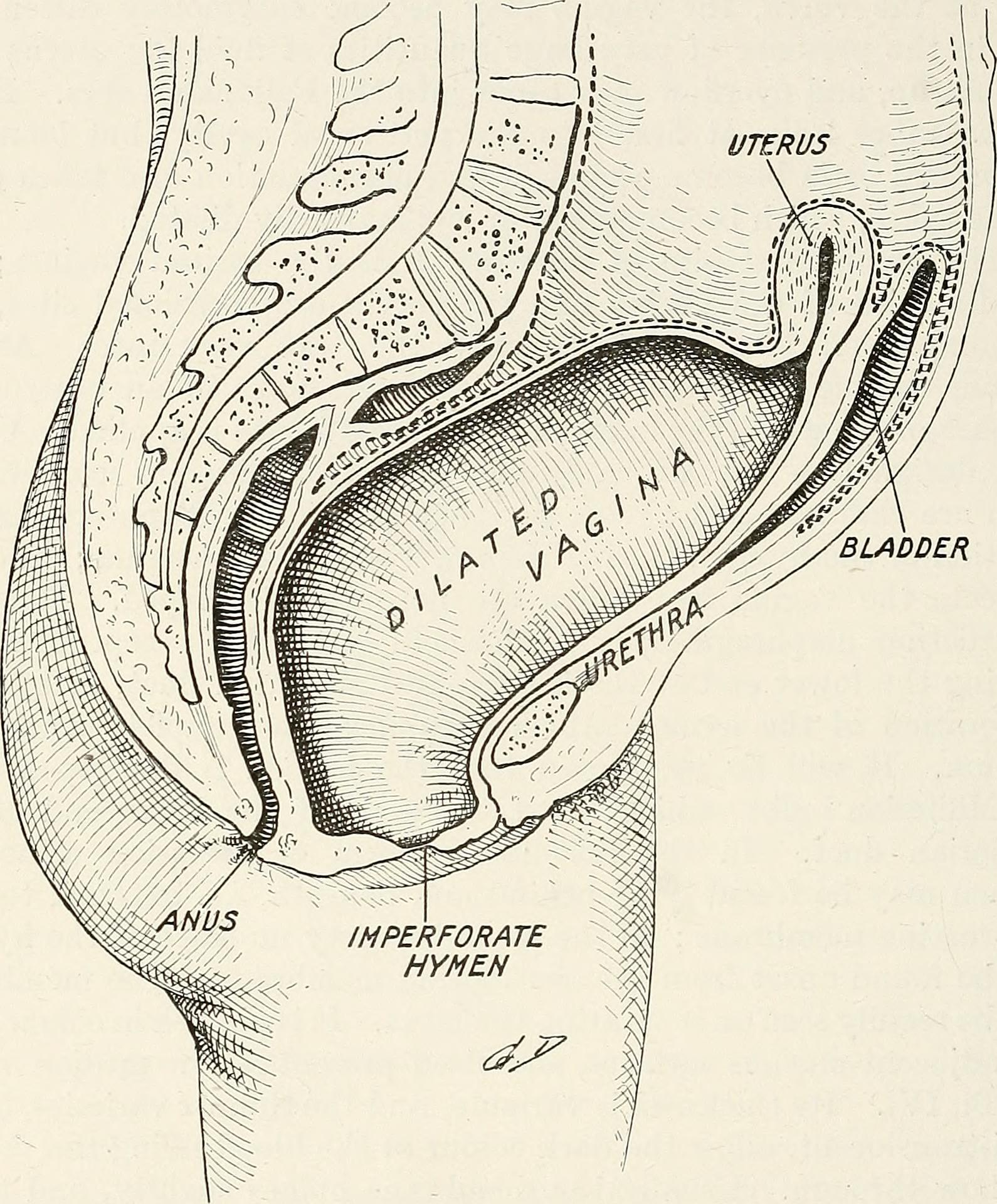
- Specialty: Gynecology

An imperforate hymen is a congenital disorder where a hymen without an opening completely obstructs the vagina. It is caused by a failure of the hymen to perforate during fetal development. It is most often diagnosed in adolescent girls when menstrual blood accumulates in the vagina and sometimes also in the uterus. It is treated by surgical incision of the hymen.

== Signs and symptoms ==
Affected newborns may present with acute urinary retention. In adolescent females, the most common symptoms of an imperforate hymen are cyclic pelvic pain and amenorrhea; other symptoms associated with hematocolpos include urinary retention, constipation, low back pain, nausea, and diarrhea. Other vaginal anomalies can have similar symptoms to an imperforate hymen. Vaginal atresia and a transverse vaginal septum require differentiation. A strong urge to defecate has been observed in a few women.

=== Complications ===
If untreated or unrecognized before puberty, an imperforate hymen can lead to peritonitis or endometriosis due to retrograde bleeding. Additionally, it can lead to mucometrocolpos (dilatation of the vaginal canal and uterus due to mucus buildup) or hematometrocolpos (dilatation due to a buildup of menstrual fluid). Mucometrocolpos and hematocolpos can in turn cause urinary retention, constipation, and urinary tract infection.

== Pathophysiology ==
An imperforate hymen is formed during fetal development when the sinovaginal bulbs fail to canalize with the rest of the vagina. Although some instances of familial occurrence have been reported, the condition's occurrence is mostly sporadic, and no genetic markers or mutations have been linked to its cause.

== Diagnosis ==
An imperforate hymen is most often diagnosed in adolescent girls after the age of menarche with otherwise normal development. In adolescent girls of menarcheal age, the typical presentation of the condition is amennorhea and cyclic pelvic pain, indicative of hematocolpos secondary to vaginal obstruction. An imperforate hymen is usually visible on vaginal inspection as a bulging blue membrane. If hematocolpos is present, a mass is often palpable on abdominal or rectal examination. The diagnosis of an imperforate hymen is usually made based purely on the physical exam, although if necessary the diagnosis can be confirmed by transabdominal, transperineal or transrectal ultrasound.

An imperforate hymen can also be diagnosed in newborn babies and it is occasionally detected on ultrasound scans of the foetus during pregnancy. In newborns the diagnosis is based on the findings of an abdominal or pelvic mass or a bulging hymen. Examination of the normal neonatal vagina usually reveals a track of mucus at the posterior commissure of the labia majora; an absence of mucus may indicate an imperforate hymen or another vaginal obstruction.

A similar condition, cribriform hymen, is diagnosed when the hymen contains many minute openings.

== Management ==
Before surgical intervention in adolescents, symptoms can be relieved by the combined oral contraceptive pill taken continuously to suppress the menstrual cycle or NSAIDs to relieve pain. Surgical treatment of the imperforate hymen by hymenotomy typically involves making cruciate incisions of the hymen, excising segments of hymen from their bases, and draining the vaginal canal and uterus. For affected girls who wish (or whose parents wish) to have their hymens preserved, surgical techniques to excise of a central flange of the hymen can be used. The timing of surgical hymen repair is controversial: some doctors believe it is best to intervene immediately after the neonatal period, while others believe that surgical repair should be delayed until puberty, when estrogenization is complete.

== Epidemiology ==
Imperforate hymen is the most common vaginal obstruction of congenital origin. Estimates of the frequency of imperforate hymen vary from 1 in 1,000 to 1 in 10,000 females.
