= Vaginal septum =

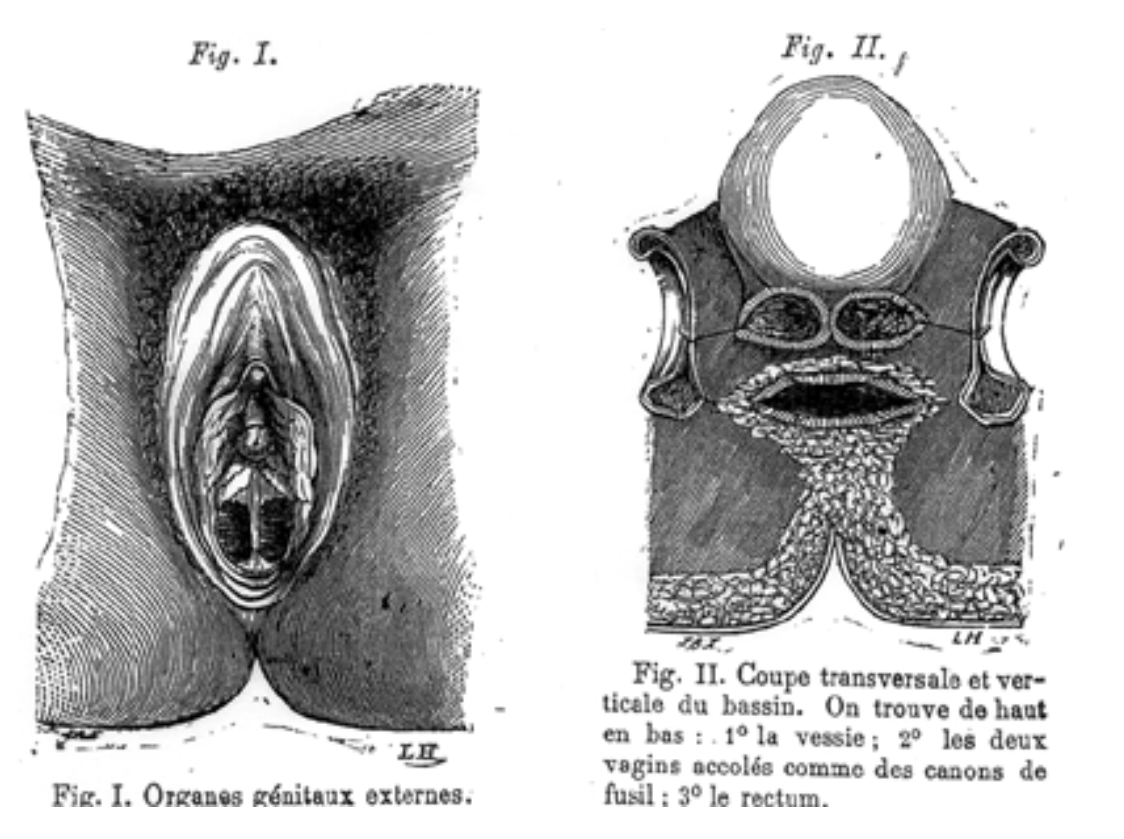
- Specialty: Gynecology

A vaginal septum is a vaginal anomaly that is partition within the vagina; such a septum could be either longitudinal or transverse. In some affected women, the septum is partial or does not extend the length or width of the vagina. Pain during intercourse can be a symptom. A longitudinal vaginal septum develops during embryogenesis when there is an incomplete fusion of the lower parts of the two Müllerian ducts. As a result, there may appear to be two openings to the vagina. There may be associated duplications of the more cranial parts of the Müllerian derivatives, a double cervix, and either a uterine septum or uterus didelphys (double uterus). A transverse septum forms during embryogenesis when the Müllerian ducts do not fuse to the urogenital sinus. A complete transverse septum can occur across the vagina at different levels. Menstrual flow can be blocked, and is a cause of primary amenorrhea. The accumulation of menstrual debris behind the septum is termed cryptomenorrhea. Some transverse septa are incomplete and may lead to dyspareunia or obstruction in labour.

== See also ==
- Diphallia
