= Catamenial pneumothorax =

- Pneumothorax shown on a chest x-ray. Air fills the space between the collapsed left lung and the chest wall.
- Specialty: Pulmonology
- Symptoms: Chest or shoulder pain, shortness of breath
- Usual onset: 30-40 years of age
- Causes: Thoracic endometriosis
- Risk factors: Congenital or acquired diaphragmatic defects allowing entry of endometrial tissue into the pleural space
- Diagnostic method: VATS procedure
- Treatment: Surgical - VATS procedure to remove ectopic endometrial tissue Pharmacologic - continuous OCP's are favored to suppress menstruation

Catamenial pneumothorax is a spontaneous pneumothorax that recurs during menstruation, within 72 hours before or after the onset of a cycle. It usually involves the right side of the chest and right lung, and is associated with thoracic endometriosis. A third to a half of patients have pelvic endometriosis as well. Despite this association, CP is still considered to be misunderstood as is endometriosis considered to be underdiagnosed. The lack of a clear cause means that diagnosis and treatment is difficult. The disease is believed to be largely undiagnosed or misdiagnosed, leaving the true frequency unknown in the general population.

Catamenial pneumothorax is defined as at least two episodes of recurrent pneumothorax corresponding with menstruation. It was first described in 1958 when a woman presented with 12 episodes of right-sided pneumothorax over 1 year, recurring monthly with menstruation. Thoracotomy revealed thoracic endometriosis. Many patients present with chest pain close to their menstrual periods. Surgical exploration can be used in an attempt to visualize the problem; mechanical pleurodesis or hormonal suppressive therapy can also be used. Sometimes, a second surgical look can show fenestrations in the diaphragm. Because endometriosis has been attributed to retrograde menstruation, upwards of 90% of affected women may have an immune deficiency. This prevents clearance of endometrial cells from the peritoneum.

Endometriosis is defined as tissue similar to the endometrial tissue that has implanted outside of the uterus. Mechanisms include retrograde menstruation resulting in abdomino-pelvic spread, blood-borne or lymphatic spread and deposition, and metaplasia.

Thoracic endometriosis is the most common non-abdominal site of involvement and is also the primary risk factor for catamenial pneumothorax. Catamenial pneumothorax is the primary clinical presentation of thoracic endometriosis, and is defined as recurrent episodes of lung collapse within 72 hours before or after menstruation.

== Signs and symptoms ==
Symptoms include chest or shoulder pain, cough, dyspnea, and shortness of breath. Chest and shoulder pain can be radiating out to the shoulder blades. A dry cough can also present and come with a "crackling" sound upon inhaling. Typically, it occurs in women aged 30 to 40 years, but it has been diagnosed in young girls as early as 10 years of age and post menopausal women (exclusively in women of menstrual age), most with a history of pelvic endometriosis. Chest pain requires immediate medical attention.

== Pathophysiology ==
Although the exact cause is not known, a few theories come from metastatic, hormonal, and anatomical possibilities. The metastatic model proposes that endometrial tissue has migrated from the endometrium to the diaphragm or the pleural space, causing small holes in the diaphragm, allowing air into the pleural space. In the hormonal model, it is believed that prostaglandin F2 causes a narrowing of the bronchioles, the small tubes within the lungs. Narrowing of these can cause the alveoli to rupture which may trap air in the pleural space. In the anatomical model, researchers believe that the absence of the cervical mucous plug, which is normally there during the menstrual cycle, allows air to pass from the genital tract to the pleural space through fenestrations in the diaphragm. Another theory is that hormonal changes that come with the menstrual cycle can cause blebs to spontaneously rupture. Blebs are small blisters/pustules filled with air or fluid and can develop on the lungs.

Endometrial tissue attaches within the thoracic cavity, forming chocolate-like cysts. Generally the parietal pleura is involved, but the lung itself, the visceral layer, the diaphragm, and more rarely the tracheobronchial tree may also be afflicted. The mechanism through which endometrial tissue reaches the thorax remains unclear.

Nearly 90% of cases occur on the right hemithorax, a phenomenon thought to potentially be due to the direction of flow of retroperitoneal fluid. Peritoneal flow occurs in a clockwise pattern, which could likely explain the tendency for catamenial pneumothoraces to be right-sided. Defects in the diaphragm, which are found often in affected individuals, could provide an entry path, as could microembolization through pelvic veins. Such diaphragmatic defects may be either congenital or acquired.

The cysts can release blood; the endometrial cyst "menstruates" in the lung. Endometrial cells undergo structural changes during the secretory phase of the menstrual cycle, in a process called decidualization. Decidualized pleural endometrial implants can disrupt the pleura and lead to pneumothorax (and hemothorax).

== Diagnosis ==
Diagnosis can be hinted by high recurrence rates of lung collapse in a woman of reproductive age with endometriosis. CA-125 is elevated.

Clinical diagnosis can be made based on history and imaging, while the gold standard for definitive diagnosis remains Video-assisted thoracoscopic surgery, or VATS, which allows not only the visualization of the lesion, but also surgical treatment via cauterization of the ectopic endometrial tissue. Special staining under a microscope or utilizing a cell marker, such as PAX8, can be used to positively identify endometrial stroma.

=== Classification ===
Catamenial pneumothorax is the most common form of thoracic endometriosis syndrome, which also includes catamenial hemothorax, catamenial hemoptysis, catamenial hemothorax and endometriosis lung nodules, as well as some exceptional presentations.

== Treatment ==
Surgery, hormonal treatments and combined approaches have all been proposed, with variable results in terms of short and long term outcome. These have both been effective, separately and together. Both have been used to treat women with this condition, and specifics depend on each patient and each situation. Surgery may be used to excise endometrial tissue from the lungs and pleural space as well as repair damage and holes in the diaphragm. Surgery may also be used to remove blisters (blebs). An additional procedure involves a mesh that is placed over the diaphragm to block any holes that may have been missed in the first surgery. Hormonal therapies can also be used to suppress ovulation. Surgical removal of the endometrial tissue should be endeavored during menstruation for optimal visualization. Pleurodesis may also be effective in removing the space between the lung and the chest wall; preventing air build up between these layers.

Non-surgical treatment includes pharmacological treatment via continuous oral contraceptive therapy to avoid cyclical bleeding with monthly menstruation. Oral contraceptives appear to be preferable for patients due to fewer negative side effects than treatment with GnRH agonist therapy, which can lead to hypoestrogenic effects including osteoporosis, resulting in discontinuation of therapy and thus a higher likelihood of recurrence of catamenial pneumothorax.

== Epidemiology ==
Some sources claim this entity represents 3 to 6% of pneumothorax in women. In regard of the low incidence of primary spontaneous pneumothorax (i.e. not due to surgical trauma etc.) in women (about 1/100'000/year), this is a very rare condition. Hence, many basic textbooks do not mention it, and many doctors have never heard of it. Therefore, catamenial pneumothorax is probably under-recognized.

== See also ==
- Catamenial epilepsy
- Catamenial migraine
