= Thoracic endometriosis =

Rare form of endometriosis

Thoracic endometriosis is a rare form of endometriosis where endometrial-like tissue is found in the lung parenchyma and/or the pleura. It can be classified as either pulmonary, or pleural, respectively. Endometriosis is characterized by the presence of tissue similar to the lining of the uterus (the endometrium) forming abnormal growths elsewhere in the body. Usually these growths are found in the pelvis, between the rectum and the uterus, the ligaments of the pelvis, the bladder, the ovaries, and the sigmoid colon. The cause is not known. The most common symptom of thoracic endometriosis is chest pain occurring right before or during menstruation. Diagnosis is based on clinical history and examination, augmented with X-ray, CT scan, and magnetic resonance imaging of the chest. Treatment options include surgery and hormones.

== Signs and symptoms ==
Thoracic endometriosis is characterised by onset of the following clinical symptoms within 24 hours prior to and 72 hours after onset of menses.

- Catamenial pneumothorax: this is the most common clinical manifestation, present in 80% of cases. Catamenial pneumothorax is defined as a recurrent pneumothorax that occurs within the first 72 hours after menstruation. It may not necessarily occur with every menstrual cycle and in most cases is one-sided and on the right side. There are cases of catamenial pneumothorax on the left side, and on very rare occasions there may be a bilateral catamenial pneumothorax. Symptoms are the same as for other types of pneumothorax: chest pain, cough and breathlessness. Symptoms are usually mild but there may be severe presentations.
- Catamenial hemothorax: this is a rare manifestation of thoracic endometriosis, occurring in 14% of cases. In almost all cases, the right side is affected but has been one case of a bilateral catamenial hemothorax documented. The most common presenting symptoms are nonspecific and include cough, chest pain and shortness of breath. In some cases, signs may mimic pulmonary embolism. The quantity of blood loss varies, but severe anemia is possible. In almost all cases, chest X-ray shows the presence of pleural effusion without specific characteristics. A CT scan may show additional features such as nodular lesions of the pleura, multiloculated effusions, or bulky pleural masses.
- Cyclic haemoptysis: haemoptysis during menstruation is extremely rare, with about 30 case reports in medical literature. Currently, there have been no reports of massive haemoptysis or death. Cyclic haemoptysis is a sign of pulmonary parenchymal endometriosis; ectopic endometrial tissue in the lung responds to cyclical hormonal variation, bleeding along with the normal endometrium located in the uterus.
- Pulmonary nodules: nodules are common radiological features in patients with thoracic endometriosis; most cases are associated with catamenial haemoptysis.

A woman with thoracic endometriosis may also have dysmenorrhoea and irregular menses.

=== Complications ===
Pneumothorax and haemothorax are rarely life-threatening. The most common complication is progressive tissue damage or scarring related to inflammation, and in extremely rare cases malignant transformation of the endometrial-like tissue.

== Cause ==
The cause of thoracic endometriosis is unknown. Those with previous surgeries are more prone to developing thoracic endometriosis due to the surgical manipulation that can cause embolisation of the endometrial tissue into the thoracic cavity. Some thoracic endometriosis patients have been described as having a congenital defect in the diaphragm. There is also an association between thoracic and pelvic endometriosis.

== Pathophysiology ==
The endometrium, the tissue that normally lines the female uterus, undergoes changes with each menstrual cycle. At the end of each cycle and after the lining has thickened in preparation for hosting a fertilised ovum, it sloughs off, detaches, and is expelled through the cervix and vagina in the process of menstruation. In endometriosis, some endometrial-like tissue is found in other parts of the body; most often the pelvis and abdomen, the central nervous system, the nasal passages, skin and thorax. At these other 'ectopic' sites, endometrium tissue still responds to hormones with normal cyclical changes - bleeding roughly every 28 days.

Theories explaining distant ectopic endometriosis include:

- Retrograde menstruation: Retrograde menstruation proposes that endometrial cells within menstrual blood travel backward through the fallopian tubes (instead of flowing out of the body through the vagina) into the peritoneal cavity, where they can adhere to peritoneal surfaces and grow. This is supported by the idea that the flow of peritoneal fluid containing endometrial cells to the left hemidiaphragm is obstructed by the falciform and phrenicocolic ligaments, subsequently only reaching the right hemidiaphragm, and the observation that endometriosis is nine times more likely to occur on the right hemidiaphragm than on the left.
- Vasculogenesis: Up to 37% of the microvascular endothelium of ectopic endometrial tissue originates from endothelial progenitor cells, which result in de novo formation of microvessels by the process of vasculogenesis rather than the conventional process of angiogenesis.
- Lymphatic spread: endometrial fragments travel through the thoracic duct and hilar lymph nodes, reaching the chest cavity and causing pulmonary or pleural endometriosis.
- Coelomic metaplasia theory: the pleura and peritoneum share the same embryological origin, both derived from mesothelium. A pathological stimulus could be responsible for inducing precursor cells (mesothelial stem cells) of the pleura or peritoneum in order to differentiate into endometrial cells.
- Vascular embolisation: endometrial fragments are taken into the venous system, travel through the right side of the heart, and are deposited in the pulmonary circulation. The endometrial tissue settles in the lung parenchyma or pleura.

A review of autopsy data showed that patients with endometriosis have bilateral pulmonary lesions, which supports the vascular embolisation theory. The pleural and/or diaphragmatic lesions were always found on the left side, which supports the theory of coelomic metaplasia.

== Diagnosis ==
The diagnosis of thoracic endometriosis is primarily based on clinical history and examination, augmented with non-invasive studies such as X-ray, CT scan, and magnetic resonance imaging of the chest. Pelvic ultrasound is also useful to determine if the patient has any degree of pelvic or abdominal endometriosis (indicated by the presence of free fluid). More invasive methods for obtaining a tissue diagnosis of thoracic endometriosis include video thoracoscopy (for pleural or pulmonary biopsy), or bronchoscopy (for pulmonary or bronchial biopsy, or bronchial lavage). A case series has been reported in which clinical diagnosis was made in 50% of patients, the rest being diagnosed either via biopsy (25%) or bronchoalveolar lavage (25%).

== Treatment ==
Definitive diagnosis is necessary to avoid unnecessary treatment and exclude more serious diagnoses (for example, haemoptysis, pleural effusion or cancer). Overall treatment for pulmonary endometriosis is surgical, with subsegmentectomy. Preserving lung parenchyma is a priority while removing macroscopic signs of pathological tissue. Medical treatment can include the use of gonadotropin-releasing hormone analogues, which can cause cessation of menstruation. Side effects of this treatment can be decreased libido, as well as a 50% recurrence rate. Even in the asymptomatic, treatment is recommended to prevent possible complications listed above.

== Epidemiology ==
Thoracic endometriosis affects women aged 15–54, who are between menarche and menopause. It can affect their quality of life, with catamenial pneumothorax being the most common presentation.
