= Cutaneous endometriosis =

Medical condition

- Specialty: Gynaecology, dermatology

Cutaneous endometriosis is characterized by the appearance of papules at the umbilicus or in lower abdominal scars after gynecologic surgery. The size averages to 2 cm in diameter. Its colour ranges from blue to violet, brown or skin-coloured.

Rarely, endometriosis may present inside the muscles of the abdominal wall instead of the skin after cesarean section.

== Signs and symptoms ==
The traditional manifestation of cutaneous endometriosis is a hard nodule or papule with an average diameter of 2 cm. If a patient presents with a nodule at the umbilicus and exhibits symptoms like discomfort, itching, bleeding, or discharge, it is recommended to consider umbilical endometriosis. Localized indications of inflammation, like erythema, could be present in the impacted regions.

Symptoms are often reported to fluctuate with the menstrual cycle. In the umbilical endometriosis, pain and other catamenial symptoms were each reported in over 80% of cases, and bleeding was reported in about 50%. In caesarean scar endometriosis cases, cyclical pain was reported by over 85% of patients.

== Causes ==
There are two types of cutaneous endometriosis: primary and secondary. Primary cutaneous endometriosis is known to develop spontaneously, yet its exact cause is unknown. It is believed that treatments related to abdominal or pelvic surgery that result in the implantation of endometrial tissue into the skin are the cause of secondary cutaneous endometriosis.

== Diagnosis ==
A biopsy of the lesion and subsequent histological analysis can be used to confirm the diagnosis.

== Treatment ==
For cutaneous endometriosis, there are two possible treatment modalities: hormone therapy and surgery. Oral contraceptives, and gonadotropin-releasing hormonal agonists are examples of hormonal therapy.

== See also ==
- Endometriosis
- Skin lesion
