= Catamenial epilepsy =

Epilepsy exacerbated during certain phases of the menstrual cycle

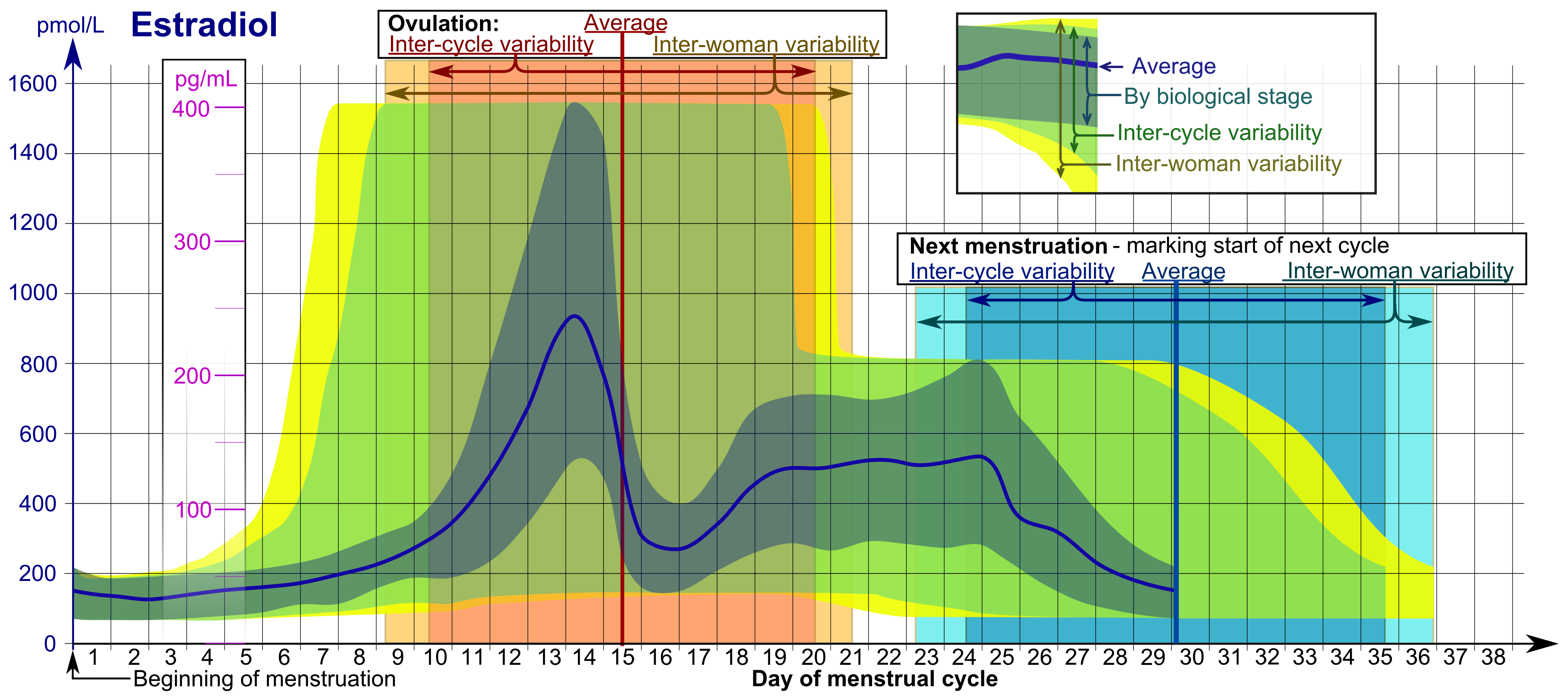
Estradiol levels during the menstrual cycle

Catamenial epilepsy is a form of epilepsy in women where seizures are exacerbated during certain phases of the menstrual cycle. In rare cases, seizures occur only during certain parts of the cycle; in most cases, seizures occur more frequently (but not exclusively) during certain parts of the cycle. Catamenial epilepsy is underlain by hormonal fluctuations of the menstrual cycle where estrogens promote seizures and progesterone counteracts seizure activity.

Since at least ancient Greek times, there has been documented studies of women with epilepsy and its correlation to the menstrual cycle. So catamenial epilepsy is a unique group of seizure disorders and these seizures are affected mainly by fluctuations in the menstrual cycle of estrogen and progesterone and to clarify the diagnosis of catamenial epilepsy charts of seizure activity are drawn during the menstrual cycle and thus three patterns of catamenial epilepsy are identified.

== Etymology ==
"Catamenia" was a scientific word for the menstrual period, formed as a neologism in the 18th century, from the Greek katamēnios = monthly (from kata = "by" + mēn = "month").

== Pathophysiology ==
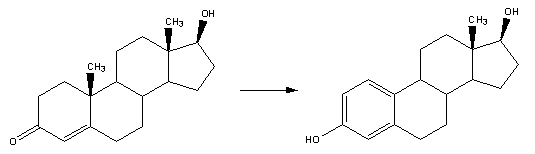
Conversion of testosterone to estradiol

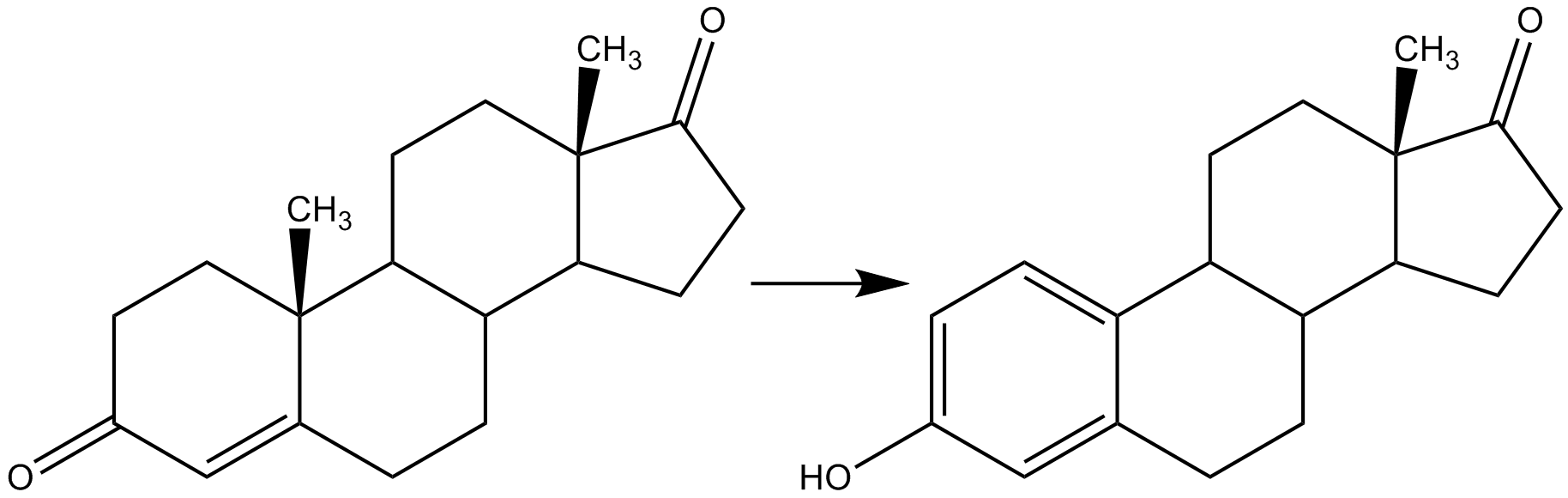
Aromatase converts androstenedione to estrone

Progesterone

Levels of the major gonadal hormones estrogen, progesterone, and testosterone vary during the menstrual cycle, and this can trigger catamenial epilepsy. These hormones are synthesized in various locations in the body, including the ovaries, adrenal gland, liver, subcutaneous fat, and brain. There is considerable research showing that these steroidal hormones are important in the pathophysiology of epilepsy. Broadly defined, estrogen and its many forms are thought to be "proconvulsant", whereas progesterone is thought to be "anticonvulsant" by virtue of its conversion to the neurosteroid allopregnanolone.

=== Estrogen (estradiol, estrone, estriol) ===
Estrogen can be found in the female body in various forms, all of which affect women with catamenial epilepsy. Estrone (E1), estradiol (E2), and estriol (E3) are the three principal circulating estrogens in the body. These three forms influence neuronal excitability, but little is known about their inter-hormone interactions, the relative concentrations and ratios of E1/E2/E3 and how that may influence the seizure frequency behavior in women with epilepsy. In normally menstruating women, serum estradiol levels are typically elevated by day 10 of the menstrual cycle, which persists until ovulation.

- Estrone's main source is adipose tissue (subcutaneous fat), where it is formed by aromatization of androstenedione. Estrone is the major estrogen after menopause, and this hormone may be very influential in seizure control of the catamenial woman if she is severely overweight or obese.
- Estradiol represents the most prolific estrogen ligand receptor in the female body, particularly in the absence of pregnancy, and is a more effective activator of estrogen receptor function than estrone or estriol. Estradiol directly increases NMDA mediated receptors of glutamate activity at the neuronal membrane. Through this mechanism hippocampal pyramidal neurons CA1 are excited, and a repetitive firing response is induced. Dendritic spine density on CA1 hippocampal pyramidal cells is dependent upon estradiol levels, showing a direct correlation during normal fluctuations during the menstrual cycle. Estradiol has been shown to apply its effects on dendritic spine density of hippocampal cells by using a mechanism that requires activation of NMDA receptors. Furthermore, Herzog postulates that, "estradiol may thus further increase excitatory input to the CA1 neurons." Through many animal models, as well as human-use of estrogen-based hormone replacement therapy, estrogens have been seen to increase the excitability of neurons, leading to a decreased seizure threshold. In female adult rat experimental trials, the limbic seizure threshold fluctuates inversely to estradiol levels during the estrous cycle.
- Estriol is known to inhibit GABA and to promote kindling and epileptiform discharges. Estriol is only produced in significant quantities during pregnancy via placental aromatization of fetal androgen, however it can also be synthesized in smaller quantities (non-pregnancy) in the liver by hydroxylation of estrone.

=== Progesterone ===
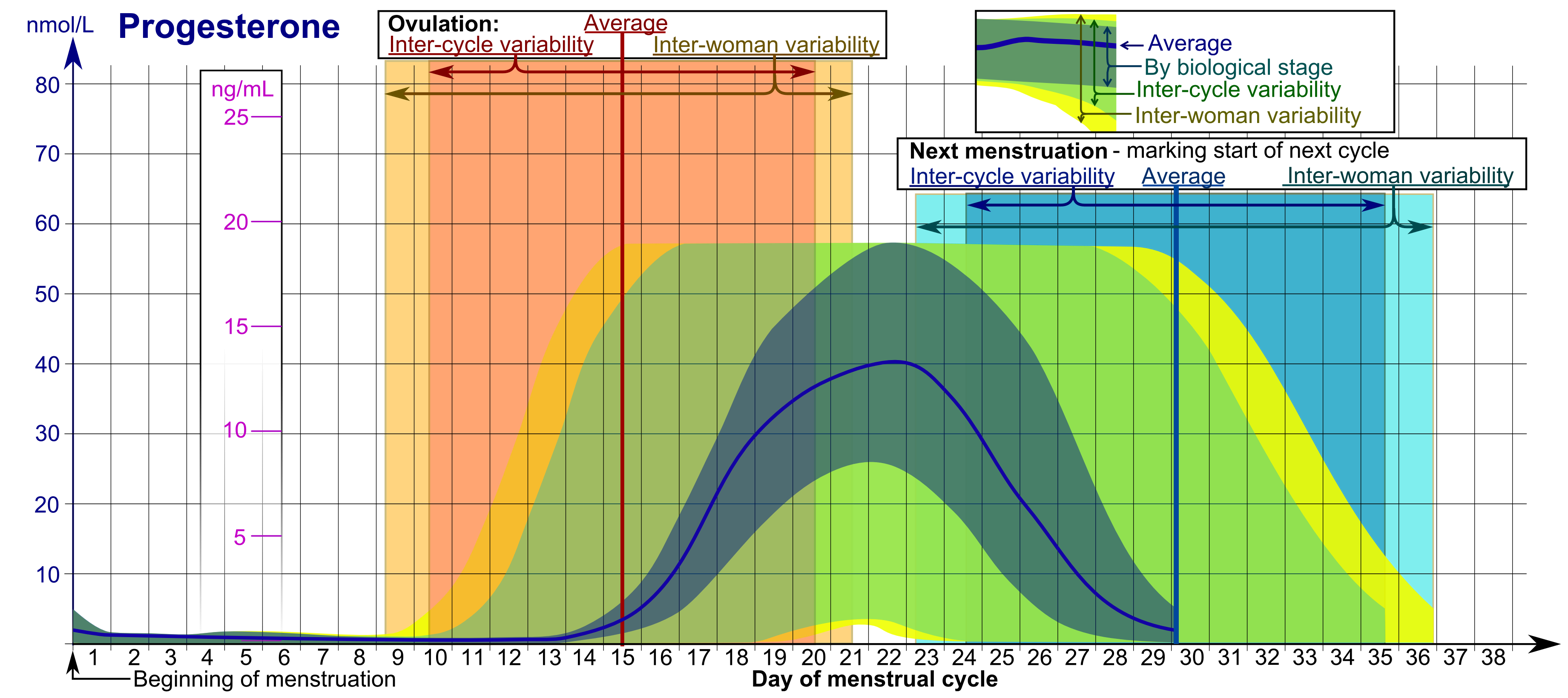
Progesterone levels during the menstrual cycle

In general, progesterone administration is anticonvulsant, as supported by experiments in laboratory animals, where injection of progesterone leads to an increase in seizure threshold, or delay to the onset of seizures induced by convulsants.

Similarly to estrogen receptors, progesterone receptors bind several molecules other than progesterone. Progestogens are group of natural non-synthetic hormones, including progesterone, which binds to progesterone receptors. Other than progesterone, progestogens have several neuroactive metabolites, most notably allopregnanolone. Progesterone has been shown to lower the number of estrogen receptors, and thus act as an antagonist to estrogen actions. In trials, both progesterone and allopregnanolone administration have shown a neuroprotective effect on hippocampal neurons in seizure models induced by kainic acid.

== Classification ==
The proper classification for catamenial epilepsy has been debatable for several decades. Researchers have defined catamenial epilepsy from the broadest definition of a "greater than" approach indicating an increase in seizure frequency or severity during any specific phase of the menstrual cycle, to a "sixfold increase" in average daily seizure frequency during specific times in the cycle. In recent years, Herzog's 1997 proposal of a twofold increase has generally been accepted: Perimenstrual (C1), Periovulatory (C2), and Luteal (C3). These three classifications are based upon serum estradiol:progesterone ratio, and a 24- to 34-day menstrual cycle in which menses begins on day 1, and ovulation occurs 14 days prior to menstruation. By this measure, approximately one-third of women with epilepsy would be classified under the designation of catamenial epilepsy.

=== Perimenstrual, C1 ===
Perimenstrual classification (in normal cycles, days –3 to 3 of menstruation) is associated with a twofold or greater increase in average daily seizure occurrence during the menstrual phase (M) compared to the follicular (F) and luteal (L) phases. The menstrual phase is characterized by drastic decreases in progesterone and estrogen levels. The estradiol:progesterone ratio is highest during the days before menstruation (C1) and ovulation (C2). Perimenstrual seizure exacerbation has been recognized as the withdrawal of the protective effects of progesterone. In a 2009 study, it was found that patients with C1 pattern of catamenial epilepsy had overall lower progesterone levels than healthy controls during the M phase.

=== Periovulatory, C2 ===
Periovulatory classification (in normal cycles, days 10 to –13) is associated with a twofold or greater increase in average daily seizure occurrence during the O phase compared to the F and L phases. The ovulatory phase is characterized by a surge of estrogen before ovulation, while an associated progesterone surge does not occur until ovulation actually occurs. This estrogen effect, without a corresponding progesterone surge of protection, intensifies seizure events.

=== Luteal, C3 ===
Luteal classification (abnormal or inadequate luteal phase cycles, days 10 to 3) is associated with a twofold or greater increase in average daily seizure occurrence during the O, L and M phases. Anovulatory women do not typically have a midcycle surge of progesterone, but still experience a surge in estrogen. These women have abnormally low progesterone levels during the O, L and M, regardless of whether ovulation occurs. In study by El-Khayat et al., it was found that patients with C3 pattern of catamenial epilepsy had overall lower progesterone levels than healthy controls during the L phase of the menstrual cycle.

== Menopause ==
During menopause, there are drastic changes in the production of gonadal hormones. Most of the reproductive hormones, including the estrogens, progesterone and testosterone, diminish initially (perimenopause), becoming irregular, often showing wide and unpredictable fluctuations. As menopause progresses, there is cessation of estrogen production by the ovaries. Rosciszewska was one of the first researchers to report an increased risk of seizures during perimenopause, but found a marked decreased risk of seizures during menopause if there was a catamenial relationship. This difference may be associated with the radical fluctuations of estradiol and progesterone during the perimenopausal period than what is experienced during the menopausal period and menstrual cycles of reproductive years. Recall that estrone is the predominant estrogen present during menopause (from subcutaneous fat), and little is known about the effect of estrone specifically on epilepsy. Women with epilepsy who do not follow a catamenial pattern may have an unpredictable increase or decrease in seizure activity in perimenopause and menopause, but women with catamenial epilepsy typically follow a more predictable pattern.

=== Hormone replacement therapy ===
The use of hormone replacement therapy (HRT), to lessen the effects of menopause, has shown severe negative effects on the seizure patterns of women with catamenial epilepsy. During perimenopause, women with catamenial epilepsy generally experience an increase in seizure frequency, and HRT use does not change this likelihood. However HRT use after perimenopause has been significantly associated with an increase in seizure frequency and severity. Women progressing through peri- and post-menopause using HRT may be in greater need of anticonvulsant medication monitoring to maintain or reduce seizure occurrence. These same results have not been seen in laboratory counterparts. Adult female rats that have been ovariectomized, a parallel state to menopause, show increased seizure frequency overall. There are, however, several factors that could explain this difference, including ovariectomized rats do not have the analogous brain hormones milieu as menopausal women. Several studies following HRT use in women with catamenial epilepsy have demonstrated more influenceable data than animal models, in this case.

== Treatment ==
Several treatment methods have been determined exclusively for women with catamenial epilepsy. A great majority of these therapies include progestogens (naturally occurring) or progestins (synthetic progestogen). Drug interactions are an important factor when using progesterone therapy, as many antiseizure medications augment hepatic metabolism of gonadal steroids, and increase serum protein binding to hormones. There are many side effects frequently seen in progesterone therapy usage, including vaginal dryness, dyspareunia, osteoporosis, and cardiovascular disease.

- Cyclic progesterone therapy supplements the patient with natural progesterone during the luteal phase when progesterone is normally low, and gradually reduces the supplementation premenstrually.
- Suppressive progestin therapy intends to suppress the menstrual cycle entirely by using injectable progestins or gonadotropin-releasing hormones (GnRH). GnRH basically mimics an ovary-free environment in the female, which is characteristic of the lack of menstrual cycle during menopause.

A 2019 Cochrane review found low certainty evidence of no treatment difference between norethisterone and placebo and moderate to low certainty of the no difference with progesterone versus placebo. The review did note however that important clinical effects could not be ruled out due to the small and under powered nature of the studies reviewed.

== See also ==
- Catamenial pneumothorax
- Catamenial migraine
