= Menstrual migraine =

Medical condition

- Other names: Catamenial migraine

Menstrual migraine (also called catamenial migraine) is the term used to describe both pure menstrual migraines and menstrually related migraines. About 7%–14% of women have migraines only at the time of menstruation. These are pure menstrual migraines. Most female migraineurs experience migraine attacks throughout the menstruation cycle with an increased number around menstruation, these are menstrually related migraine.

Menstrual-related migraines happen in around a quarter of women who have migraine headaches. Menstrual migraine attacks usually last longer than other migraine attacks, and short-term treatments do not work as well with menstrual migraine as they do with other kinds of migraine. For predictable menstrual migraines, triptans can be taken in the days before the menstrual period starts to prevent menstrual migraines, for women that do not respond well to acute treatment and where lifestyle changes are ineffective.

== Signs and symptoms ==
=== Warning symptoms ===
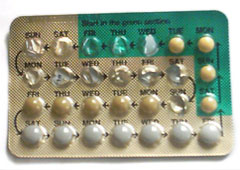
This is a blister-pack of Levlen®ED birth control pills. These pills contain ethinylestradiol, a potent synthetic estrogen. Stopping use of the pill may cause a woman's estrogen levels to drop; that may cause a menstrual migraine in some women.

Warning symptoms, also called prodrome symptoms, often happen before a migraine attack. These include:

- Sleepiness
- Fatigue
- Depression (feeling sad), euphoria (feeling very happy) or irritability
- Restlessness
- Excessive (too much) yawning
- Food cravings especially for sweet or salty foods or loss of appetite
- Increased thirst
- Diarrhea
- Nausea
- Bloating: the body retains (keeps) too much water
- Neck stiffness
- Talkativeness (talking too much)
- Feeling light-headed
- Uterine pain and cramping

=== Headache ===
A pounding throbbing headache with pain on one side of the head (unilateral). The headache often moves from one side of the head to another.

=== Associated conditions ===
Often, having one medical condition makes it more likely that a person will also have one or more other medical or psychiatric disorders. These other disorders are the "comorbid disorders" or "comorbidities". There are various comorbid medical and psychiatric conditions associated with migraines. The treatment and prognosis (if a disease gets better, worse or stays the same over time) of migraine is affected by the comorbid disorders which may be present and/or the chance of getting comorbid disorders.

- Asthma – Premenstrual asthma (PMA): This is when asthma symptoms get worse during the premenstrual period. This condition may affect up to 40% of females with asthma. For a diagnosis of PMA to be made, it is necessary to have a detailed history of the timing of menstrual cycles along with asthma symptoms experienced, and the peak expiratory flow rate (PMA may cause the PEF to be lowered in the premenstrual period). In making a diagnosis, It is helpful to keep a diary of symptoms and peak expiratory flow (PEF) rates.
- Raynaud syndrome: This is a circulatory disorder in which the smaller arteries that supply blood to the extremities – most often the hands, but it may also affect the toes, the tip of the nose and the ears – become narrower reducing blood flow. This causes the extremities to become numb and to be cooler than the core body temperature. It can be triggered by exposure to stress and cold.

== Causes ==
The exact causes of menstrual migraine are not known for sure, but there is a link between falling levels of the female hormone estrogen and the onset of a migraine attack. The estrogen level falls in the days just before menstruation, or when external estrogen is stopped, such as during the pill-free interval of combined birth control pills or after a course of hormone replacement therapy.

== Diagnosis ==
The diagnosis of a menstrual migraine is made by keeping track of when the migraines occur for a period of at least three months. Menstrually related migraine attacks usually occur between 2 days before and 3 days after the start of menstruation in at least 2 out of 3 menstrual cycles (periods) in a row.

The Menstrual Migraine Assessment Tool (MMAT) is a simple questionnaire with three questions that has shown to be fairly accurate in diagnosing menstrual migraine (Tepper SJ, 2008). The three questions are:

1. Do migraines occur in the space of time 2 days before the beginning of a woman's period until the third day after the start of the period? And does this happen in most months?
2. Do headaches that happen during this time become very severe?
3. Does the woman experience photophobia (which is when a medical problem causes light to bother a person's eyes)?

The answer to the first question has to be yes, and there has to be at least one yes answer to either question 2 or question 3.

In order to keep track of what time of the month the migraines happen, it is helpful to use a headache diary. A person uses the headache diary to write down information about their headaches, like when they started, what kind of symptoms they had and how bad the pain was etc.

== Prevention ==
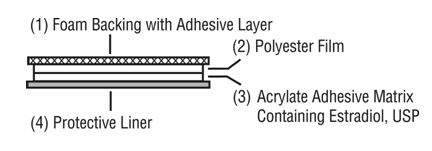
An estradiol transdermal patch. Estradiol is one of the three kinds of estrogen. This patch is worn on the skin and the estradiol enters the body through the skin.

For predictable menstrual migraines, triptans can be taken in the days before the menstrual period starts to prevent menstrual migraines, for women that do not respond well to acute treatment and where lifestyle changes are ineffective.

Other preventative drugs may include:

- Beta blockers—such as propranolol, nadolol, atenolol, and metoprolol
- Tricyclic antidepressants (TCAs) and other kinds of antidepressant medications are often used for migraine prevention. These include amitriptyline, nortriptyline, and doxepin.
- Prophylactic use of estrogen containing contraceptives

Preventative treatments for menstrual migraine should be tried for at least 3 menstruation cycles to determine effectiveness.

== Treatment ==
Acute treatments (short-term treatment) include drugs called nonsteroidal anti-inflammatory drugs (NSAIDs) (drugs that help stop inflammation which is redness, swelling, pain); triptans such as frovatriptan, ergotomines which are a kind of drug made from a fungus called ergot; and estrogen transdermal patches, which are patches worn on the skin that have estrogen in them which enters the body through the skin and then into the bloodstream.

== See also ==
- Catamenial epilepsy
- Catamenial pneumothorax
