= Endometriosis =

Growth of uterine-lining tissue elsewhere in the body

- Specialty: Gynecology
- Symptoms: Pelvic pain; infertility; painful periods
- Usual onset: Adolescence or early 20s
- Duration: Long-term
- Causes: Unknown
- Risk factors: Family history; early first period; short cycle length
- Diagnostic method: Based on symptoms, medical imaging, tissue biopsy
- Differential diagnosis: Adenomyosis; irritable bowel syndrome; bladder pain syndrome
- Treatment: NSAIDs; continuous birth control pills; hormonal IUD (coil); surgery
- Frequency: Roughly 10% of women of reproductive age

Endometriosis is a disease in which tissue similar to the endometrium—the lining of the uterus (womb)—grows elsewhere in the body. The tissue most often grows close to the uterus, such as on the ovaries, fallopian tubes, or the lining of the pelvis. It can also appear on the bowel, bladder, and in some cases on the lungs or skin. Worldwide, endometriosis affects approximately 10% of the female population of reproductive age, representing nearly 200 million women. Symptoms typically begin in adolescence or the early 20s, and tend to improve after menopause as estrogen levels go down.

Symptoms vary widely between individuals. Some have no symptoms, while for others it is a debilitating disease. Common symptoms include pelvic pain, heavy and painful periods, pain with bowel movements, painful urination, painful sex, fatigue, and infertility. Beyond bodily symptoms, endometriosis can affect a person's mental health and social life. It is not known exactly what causes the disease. Possible causes include backward (retrograde) flow of menstrual fluid, genetic factors, hormones, and problems with the immune system.

A presumed diagnosis can be made based on symptoms and medical imaging; laparoscopy (keyhole surgery) with a biopsy can provide definite confirmation. Other causes of similar symptoms include adenomyosis, uterine fibroids (both of these are conditions that affect the uterus), irritable bowel syndrome, and bladder pain syndrome. On average, it takes 5–12 years from the start of symptoms to receive a diagnosis. Many women report being incorrectly told their symptoms are trivial or normal.

While there is no cure for endometriosis, several treatments can improve symptoms. These include hormonal treatments, pain medication, and surgery. First-line treatments usually consist of hormonal treatment—such as a hormonal IUD (coil) or continuous use of a birth control pill—combined with a non-steroidal anti-inflammatory drug (NSAID) such as naproxen. Other hormonal treatment may be tried if these are not effective. Most individuals benefit from drug treatment, though this approach may lose effectiveness over time. Lesions (patches of endometriosis) may be removed surgically in women whose symptoms are not relieved by other treatments, or when endometriosis is associated with infertility. However, in a substantial minority of such cases, endometriosis returns after surgery.

== Subtypes ==
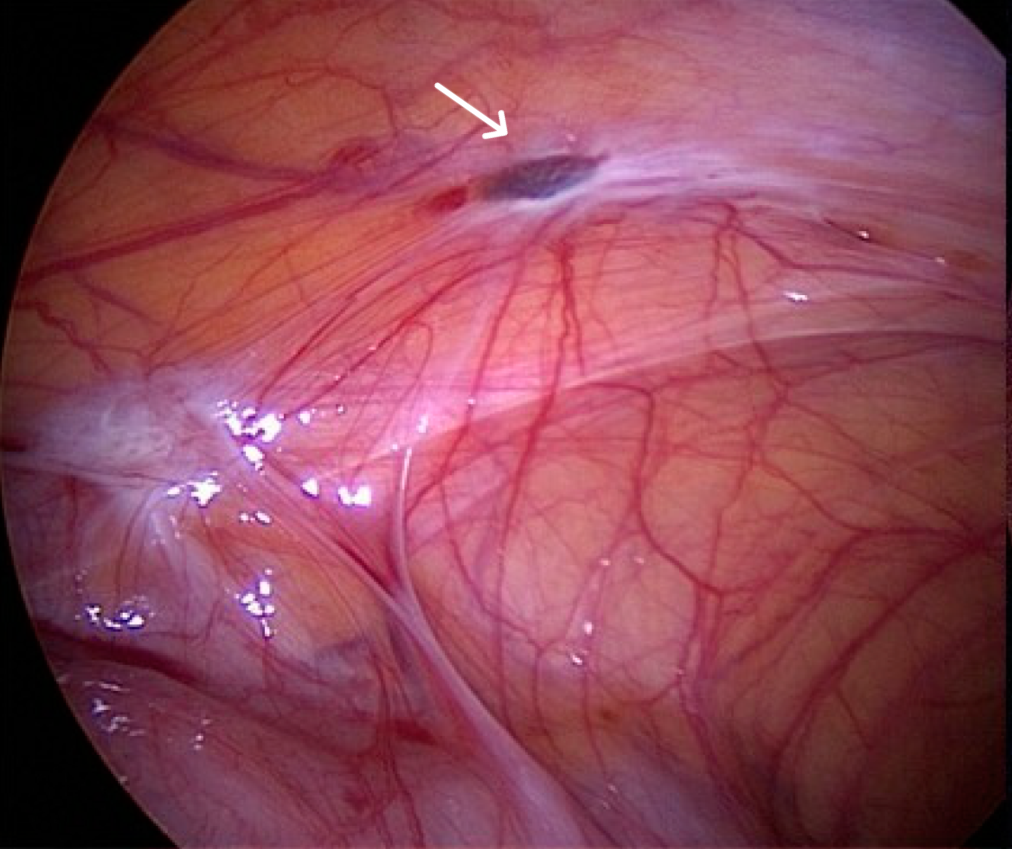
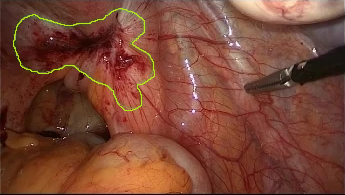
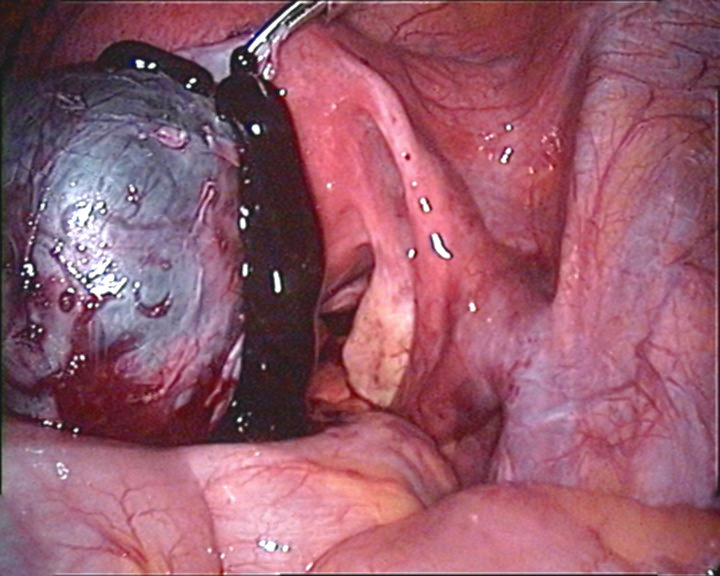
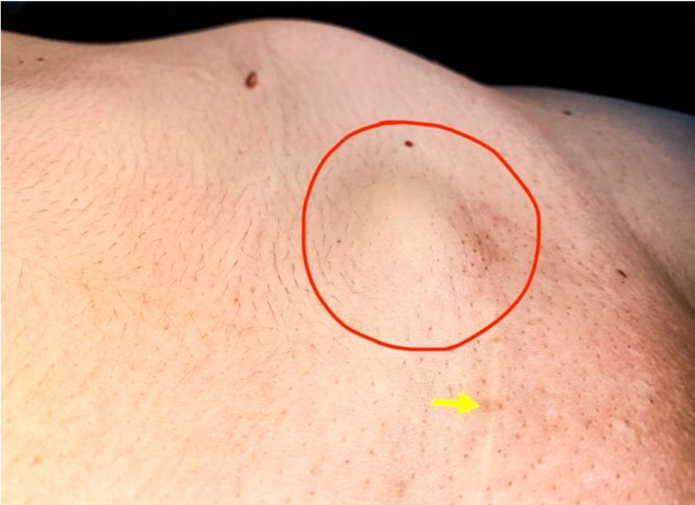
Subtypes of endometriosis. From top to bottom, left to right: superficial peritoneal endometriosis, deep infiltrating endometriosis, a ruptured chocolate cyst, and a mass of scar endometriosis encircled in red next to a caesarean section scar (yellow arrow).

Endometriosis occurs when endometrium-like tissue grows outside the uterus, forming patches called lesions or implants. It can be classified into three subtypes, or four if extra-pelvic endometriosis is included:

Superficial peritoneal endometriosis
Small lesions that grow on the peritoneum, the membrane lining the abdominal cavity and covering the surface of pelvic organs
Deep infiltrating endometriosis
Lesions that grow into the tissue beneath the lining of the pelvis or into the muscle layers of pelvic organs
Endometriomas
Cysts that grow in the ovaries
Extrapelvic endometriosis
Lesions outside the pelvic region, such as in the lungs or diaphragm

Subtypes can exist in isolation or in combination with one another. When lesions grow more than 5 mm beneath the peritoneal surface, they are classified as deep infiltrating endometriosis. Deep endometriosis can infiltrate the muscular layer of organs like the bowel or bladder. It often forms nodules, and can be associated with fibrosis and adhesions. Endometriomas are filled with old menstrual blood among other material and appear dark brown, giving rise to the name "chocolate cysts".

Endometriosis most commonly affects the ovaries; the fallopian tubes between the ovaries and the uterus; the outer surface of the uterus; and the tissues that hold the uterus in place. Less common pelvic sites are the rectum, bladder, bowel, vulva, vagina, and cervix. Extrapelvic endometriosis—for instance in the lungs or diaphragm (thoracic endometriosis), brain, or skin—is rare. Scar endometriosis can form on the abdominal wall as a complication of surgery, most often following a caesarean section or other pelvic surgery. It forms at or near the location of the surgical cut.

== Signs and symptoms ==
Common symptoms of endometriosis include:

- Painful periods
- Chronic pelvic pain
- Painful sex
- Painful urination or bowel movements
- Fatigue
- Heavy menstrual bleeding
- Infertility

Some individuals have no symptoms, while others experience severe, life-altering pain. The amount of pain is only weakly related to the anatomical extent of endometriosis. Those with limited endometriosis may have significant pain, while those with severe endometriosis may have few symptoms. Symptoms typically start in adolescence or the early 20s and usually disappear during menopause, as estrogen levels decline. For some, especially women using hormone replacement therapy, symptoms may continue or even appear for the first time during menopause.

Painful symptoms can occur anytime during the menstrual cycle, but are usually more intense during menstruation; in other words, they follow a cyclical pattern. The pain may feel like clawing fingernails or stabbing knives in the lower abdomen, while the period pain specifically can be dull and cramping in nature. The pain may radiate to the lower back. Symptoms can interfere with daily activities, such as school, work, or social activities.

Endometriosis can also involve symptoms like constipation, diarrhea, nausea, bloating, and rectal or abdominal pain. This is sometimes caused by endometriosis on the bowels, but can also be due to concurrent irritable bowel syndrome (IBS). Deep infiltrating endometriosis in the bowel or bladder can cause bowel obstruction and cyclical blood in stool or blood in urine. Premenstrual spotting is also common.

About a quarter of women diagnosed with endometriosis experience infertility. In some women, infertility is the only symptom they experience. The World Health Organization estimates that endometriosis is the ultimate cause of female infertility in 4.8% of cases.

Thoracic endometriosis—endometriosis on the diaphragm, lungs, or pleura (around the lungs)—can cause cyclical cough and cyclical shoulder pain. When present in the lungs, it can cause cyclical blood discharge from the lungs during menstruation. When found in the pleura, it can cause cyclical collapsed lung and bleeding into the pleural space. Most often, the endometriosis is found in the right lung. Endometriosis around scars can be painful and swell during periods. Sciatic endometriosis, which involves the sciatic nerve, causes cyclical nerve pain in the leg.

=== Concurrent conditions ===
Endometriosis is associated with a higher risk of complications during pregnancy. Women with endometriosis have a three-fold increased risk of a placenta previa, in which the placenta partially or completely covers the cervical opening. Preterm delivery is almost 50% more likely. Other complications are stillbirth, gestational hypertension, pre-eclampsia, and placental abruption. The rare complication of spontaneous hemoperitoneum in pregnancy, which is highly dangerous to both mother and fetus, is also more common in women with endometriosis.

Beyond its effects in pregnancy, endometriosis is linked to cardiovascular disease, particularly in those who have had the uterus and ovaries removed as treatment for endometriosis. Cohort studies have found associations with strokes, heart attacks (myocardial infarction), high blood pressure, and irregular heartbeat. Depression and anxiety are more common in people with endometriosis compared to healthy people, but occur at the same rate as they do among people with other chronic pain conditions. It is unclear how much this is caused by shared underlying mechanisms, the impact of severe symptoms, stigma, diagnostic delays, or the ineffectiveness of treatment.

Endometriosis often co-occurs with other pain disorders (such as IBS), autoimmune disorders (such as lupus or rheumatoid arthritis), certain cancers, stroke, and long COVID. For instance, a quarter of women with endometriosis have at least one other pain condition. Women with endometriosis have an increased risk of developing ovarian and thyroid cancers, as well as a slightly higher risk of breast cancer.

== Risk factors ==
=== Genetics ===
Genetics is a significant but not the sole risk factor for endometriosis. Studies attribute half of the risk to genetics; the other half is attributed to environmental factors (like exposures or lifestyle factors). Individuals who have a first-degree relative with endometriosis—such as a parent, sibling, or child—have a three- to nine-fold higher risk of developing the condition. Eighty genetic regions (loci) have been associated with endometriosis. The genes linked to endometriosis help control cancer-related processes, sex-hormone signals, womb development, molecules related to inflammation and adhesions, and the growth of new blood vessels.

There is significant overlap between the genetic basis of endometriosis, other pain conditions, and inflammatory conditions. For instance, endometriosis shares some genetic risk factors with migraine, headaches, and neck and back pain, as well as asthma and osteoarthritis.

=== Reproductive and environmental factors ===
People whose menstrual outflow is obstructed are at greater risk of developing endometriosis. This could for instance be because of an imperforate hymen, a birth defect where the vagina is completely blocked. Another type of obstruction occurs when extra tissue divides the vagina into two sides. This can happen alongside a double uterus. If one side is blocked (an obstructed hemi-vagina), menstrual blood cannot flow out and becomes trapped. Other risk factors are having a first period before age 12, a menstrual cycle of fewer than 28 days, a low BMI, and not having had children.

Little is known about environmental risk factors. Exposure to certain classes of environmental pollutants seems to raise risks. The most studied of these are endocrine disruptors—chemicals that interfere with hormones such as estrogen. They include dioxins, phthalates, bisphenol A, and polychlorinated biphenyl. Epidemiological and experimental data suggest that exposure to some of them can increase the risk of endometriosis. Night work and red meat consumption are associated with an increased risk too.

== Mechanism ==
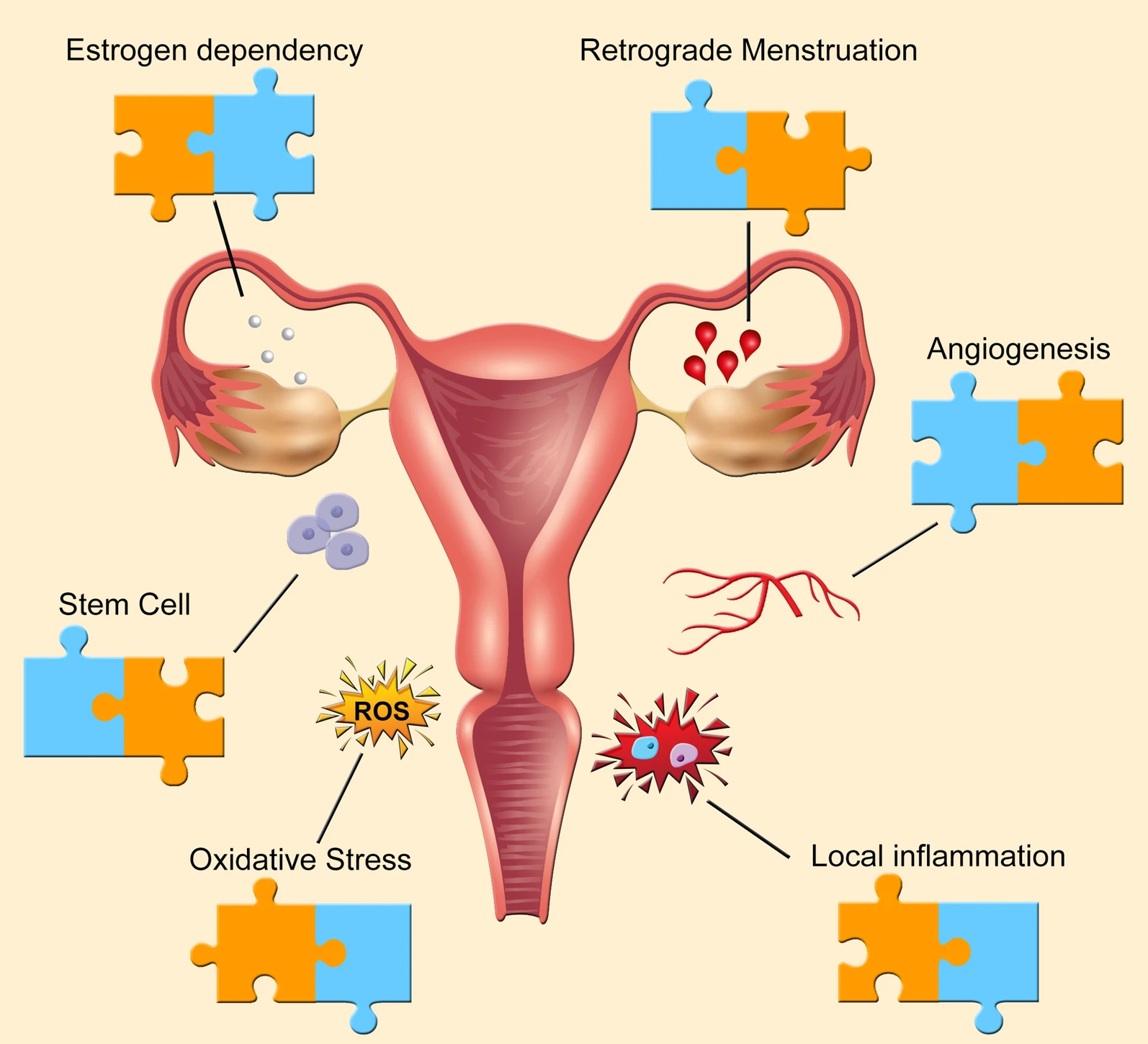
Six characteristics of endometriosis: estrogen dependency, retrograde menstruation, angiogenesis, local inflammation, oxidative stress and stem cells

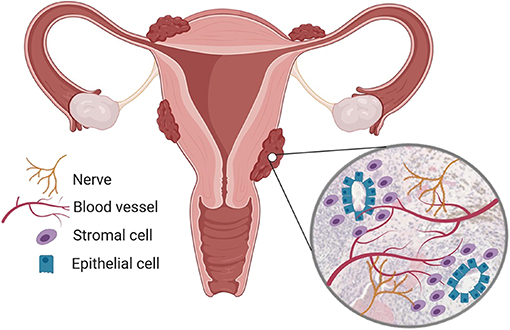
Endometriosis lesions have both endometrium-like stromal cells (which normally forms supporting tissue) and epithelial cells, and associated blood vessels and nerves.

Endometriosis is an inflammatory disease defined by the presence of tissue similar to the lining of the uterus (the endometrium) elsewhere in the body. The endometrium is the tissue that grows over the course of a menstrual cycle and then gets shed with some blood during menstruation. Like the endometrium, endometriosis lesions can shed tissue; however, because this tissue has nowhere to go, it stays close to the lesion.

This trapped tissue, together with the lesions themselves, causes inflammation and can trigger the formation of adhesions, fibrous bands that form between tissues and organs and bind organs together. The lesions can further cause fibrosis, which is excess connective tissue from healing, a form of scarring. Finally, the trapped tissue can form cysts. It is not completely understood how endometriosis causes infertility and pain.

=== Formation ===
The main theories for the formation of the endometrium-like tissue outside the womb are backward flow of menstrual blood, metastasis via the lymphatic or the circulatory system, and local transformation of peritoneal cells into endometrial-like cells (coelomic metaplasia).

During menstruation, some menstrual blood, tissue, and fluid can flow backward through the fallopian tubes and exit into the pelvic area (the peritoneal cavity). This backward flow (retrograde menstruation) is thought to be the main reason why endometriosis develops inside the pelvic area. Evidence supporting the theory comes from retrospective epidemiological studies and DNA analysis. Furthermore, only animals with a menstrual cycle, such as rhesus monkeys and baboons, develop endometriosis. In contrast, animals like rodents and non-human primates with an estrous cycle, in which the endometrium is reabsorbed rather than shed, do not develop the disease naturally. However, almost all women have some backward flow of menstrual fluid, but only 10% develop endometriosis.

Endometriosis has been documented in men, prepubescent girls, and in female fetuses, demonstrating that menstruation is not required for the condition to develop. One explanation for endometriosis in girls before puberty is that cells in the peritoneum may be able to change into endometrium-like tissue. Endometriosis in men may arise from leftover embryonic tissue which would normally disappear in male development, but forms the female reproductive system in women.

Stem cells in the basal layer of the endometrium renew the tissue after menstruation. In women with endometriosis, more tissue is shed from this layer during menstruation, allowing more stem cells to flow back into the peritoneum with retrograde menstruation and form lesions. Stem cells from bone marrow may provide an explanation for endometriosis outside the pelvic region. An alternative explanation for extrapelvic endometriosis is metastasis via the lymphatic or the circulatory system.

For endometriosis to develop, its cells must evade destruction by the immune system, attach to a surface, and promote the formation of new blood vessels, similar to some cancerous tumors. Immune dysfunction could be involved in the disease in various ways. It may reduce destruction of endometrial cells outside the womb. Additionally, local inflammation may make it more likely that the cells attach to a surface and may reduce programmed cell death (apoptosis). Angiogenesis, the formation of new blood vessels, is a likely driver of the formation and maintenance of endometriotic lesions. Cells in the peritoneum of women with endometriosis release more growth factors that stimulate angiogenesis.

Endometriosis lesions require estrogen to grow. This estrogen is produced both within the lesions themselves and in other parts of the body. Sometimes, the cells in endometriosis are progesterone-resistant or develop resistance during treatment with the hormone. This weakened response to progesterone allows endometriosis to continue growing outside the womb.

=== Pain ===
There are multiple possible causes of pain associated with endometriosis and the main drivers of pain may differ from person to person. The growth of new blood vessels and nerves in lesions is thought to play an important role. The inflammation and fibrosis around endometriosis can cause pain by activating pain-sensing nerves. Neuropathic pain can arise from nerve damage; In rare cases, endometriosis infiltrates or compresses nerves, and nerves might also be damaged as a complication of endometriosis surgery. Estrogens can increase communication between immune cells and nerves in lesions, which may contribute to further pain. Finally, there may be systemic (body-wide) inflammation, involving white blood cells. This can lead to nociplastic pain, which amplifies pain signals and reduces pain inhibition. This type of pain is associated with poor sleep, memory problems, and fatigue.

=== Infertility ===
The infertility associated with endometriosis is likely to have multiple causes. Inflammation and hormonal dysfunction explain some instances: they can disrupt the ovarian environment and reduce egg quality. The ovarian reserve, the number of viable egg cells in the ovaries, is typically lower in those with endometriosis. In particular, endometriomas may reduce ovarian reserve in affected ovaries. There is contradictory evidence on whether endometriosis causes reduced ovulation. Anatomical distortions, for instance from adhesions, can explain further instances of infertility, and in severe cases, sperm or egg cells may be fully blocked. Pain during sex may lead couples to avoid it, leading to fewer opportunities for natural conception.

== Diagnosis ==
Endometriosis may be suspected in women with chronic pelvic pain, painful periods affecting daily life, pain during sex, bowel or urinary symptoms linked to the menstrual cycle, or infertility. The diagnostic process starts with a health history and a physical examination. A presumed diagnosis can be made based on symptoms together with ultrasound or MRI imaging. The gold standard for definite diagnosis is via surgery and a biopsy, but there has been a shift away from requiring surgical confirmation to prevent treatment delays. There are no validated blood tests for endometriosis.

Studies in Western countries show that diagnosis tends to take five to twelve years from the onset of symptoms. This delay has remained persistent. On average, individuals wait one to four years before seeking medical help, which might be explained by the normalization of symptoms, the lack of awareness, and lack of access to healthcare. After seeking help, it can take up to eight years to get a diagnosis, reflecting a normalization of symptoms by healthcare providers, limited expertise and tools, and general inefficiencies in healthcare.

=== Health history and physical examination ===
Initial assessment includes screening of risk factors and an evaluation of symptoms. Both general symptoms and those linked to deep endometriosis or endometriosis outside the pelvis are assessed. A trauma-informed approach validates pain, fosters trust, and screens for trauma before a physical exam. The initial assessment further includes questions about possible complications, like depression.

The physical examination can include an abdominal exam; a single-digit exam of the vagina and pelvic floor; a bimanual exam; and examination with a speculum. Findings that suggest endometriosis include nodularity or tenderness at the back of the uterus, decreased mobility of the uterus, and visible endometriosis lesions in the vagina. Even if nothing is found on examination, endometriosis may still be present; a pelvic exam cannot detect superficial peritoneal endometriosis.

=== Imaging ===
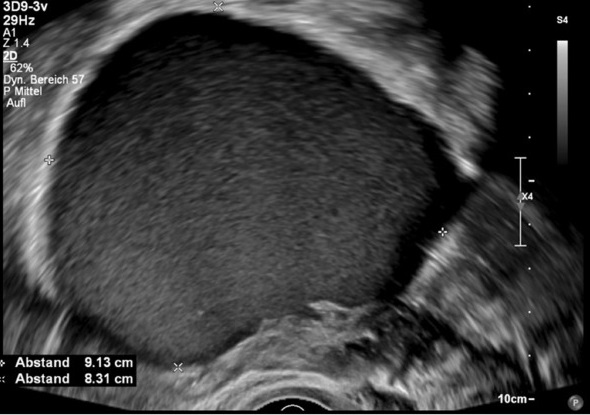
Ultrasound image of a 8 x 9 cm endometrioma, exhibiting a characteristic ground-glass appearance on ultrasound

Transvaginal ultrasound can be used to diagnose endometriomas and deep infiltrating endometriosis. To detect deep endometriosis more reliably, the ultrasound is extended to the back of the pelvis towards locations where deep endometriosis is often found. In addition, pressure is applied with hands or the probe (transducer) to assess organ mobility. Not all lesions are visible on ultrasound, so it cannot be used to rule out a diagnosis of endometriosis.

If a transvaginal ultrasound is not suitable or is declined, an alternative is an ultrasound via the lower abdomen. Abdominal ultrasounds can find endometriomas, but are not suitable for assessing deep endometriosis.

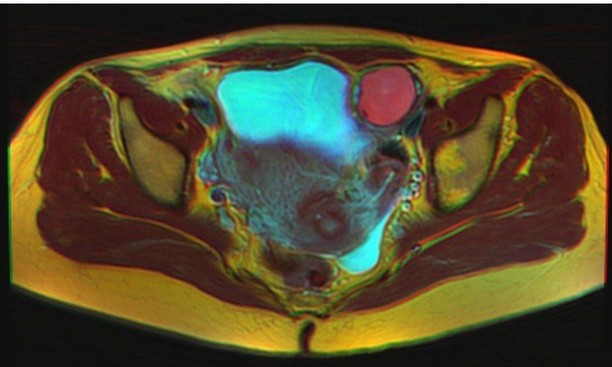
The light red cyst in this trichromatic color MRI is an endometrioma.

Although MRI is not widely used due to higher cost and limited availability, it can reliably detect endometriomas and deep infiltrating endometriosis. MRI is sometimes used for planning surgery, for instance if an ultrasound is unclear, or for diagnosis if a transvaginal ultrasound is not appropriate or is declined. An MRI has a larger field of view than an ultrasound, which allows a larger part of the bowel to be assessed, as well as extrapelvic endometriosis.

=== Keyhole surgery ===
Laparoscopy (keyhole surgery) is a surgical procedure where a camera is used to look inside the abdominal cavity. Laparoscopy with a biopsy is the most accurate way to diagnose endometriosis. It can be used when endometriosis is suspected and imaging does not show any clear causes for symptoms. In nearly 40% of women undergoing laparoscopic surgery for pelvic pain, no cause is discovered.

Surgery is not always needed: if imaging does not show clear signs of endometriosis, a presumed diagnosis can be made instead if symptoms improve with treatment ('empirical treatment'). Surgery for diagnosis allows for surgical treatment of uncomplicated endometriosis at the same time.

The lesions of superficial endometriosis often appear dark blue or black. In the earlier stages of disease, they may be white, red, or yellow-brown. Endometriomas (also called chocolate cysts) are typically dark brown. Adhesions are made up of fibrous scar tissue. Deep endometriosis looks like multiple distinct nodules. A biopsy may not detect endometriosis even when the disease is present, particularly in younger women. As such, a biopsy alone cannot be used to rule out a diagnosis of endometriosis. For confirmation, biopsy samples should show at least two of the following features:

- Endometrial type stroma
- Endometrial epithelium with glands
- Evidence of chronic bleeding, such as hemosiderin (iron) deposits
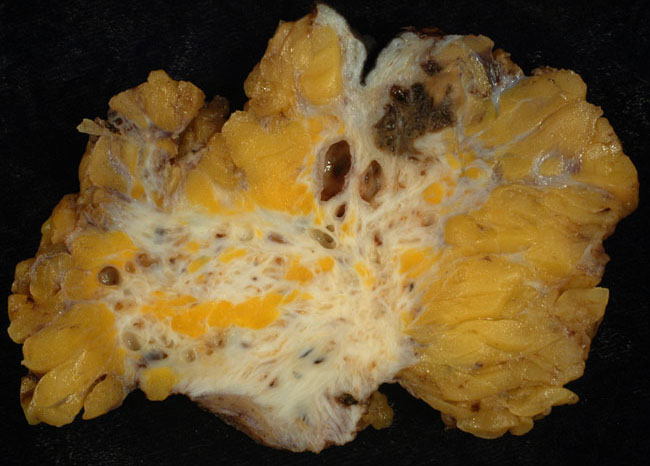
Abdominal wall endometriosis. The yellow adipose (fat) tissue contains dark blood-filled cysts, white fibrous bands, and areas of bleeding.

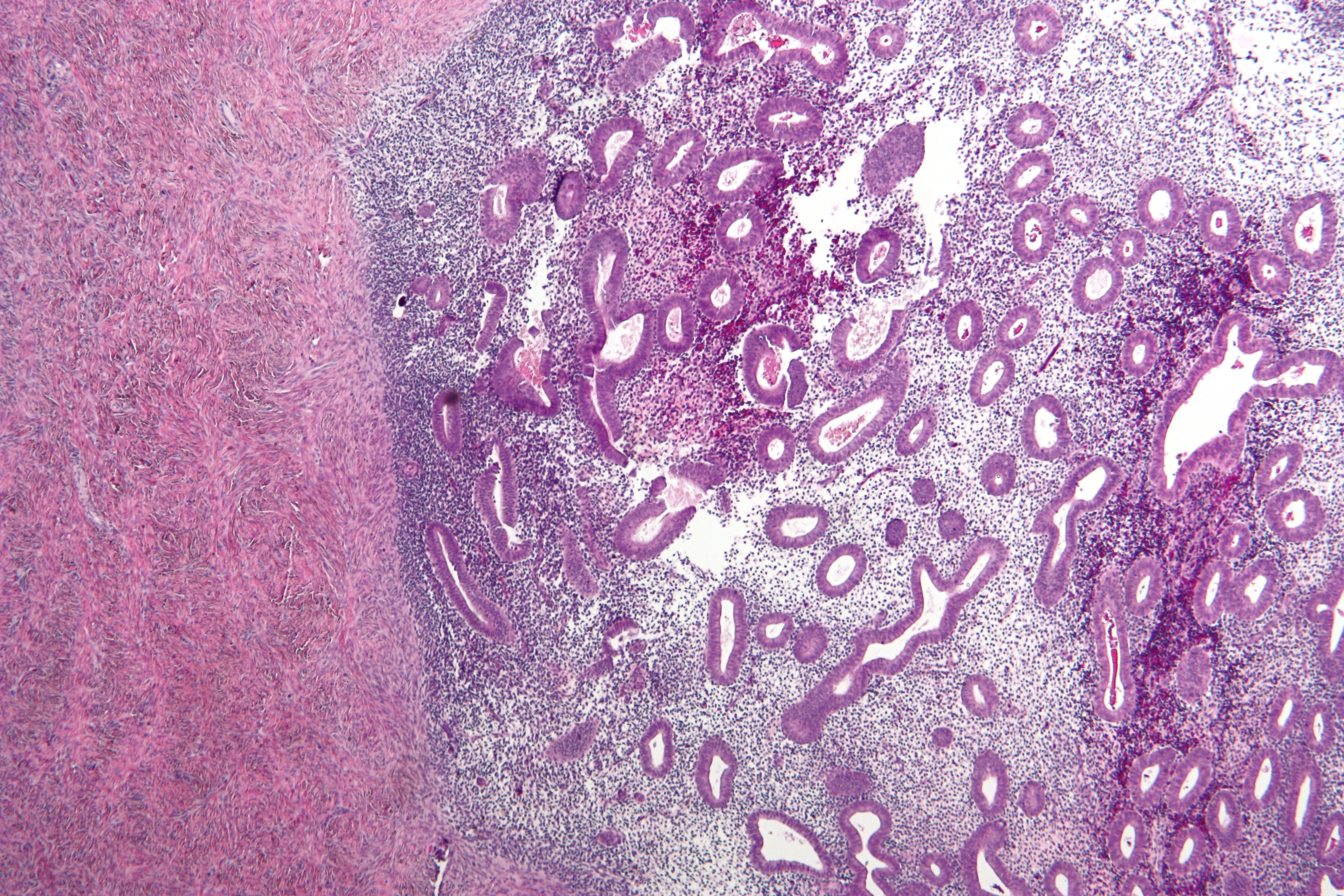
Microscope image showing endometriosis tissue (right) and ovarian stroma (left)

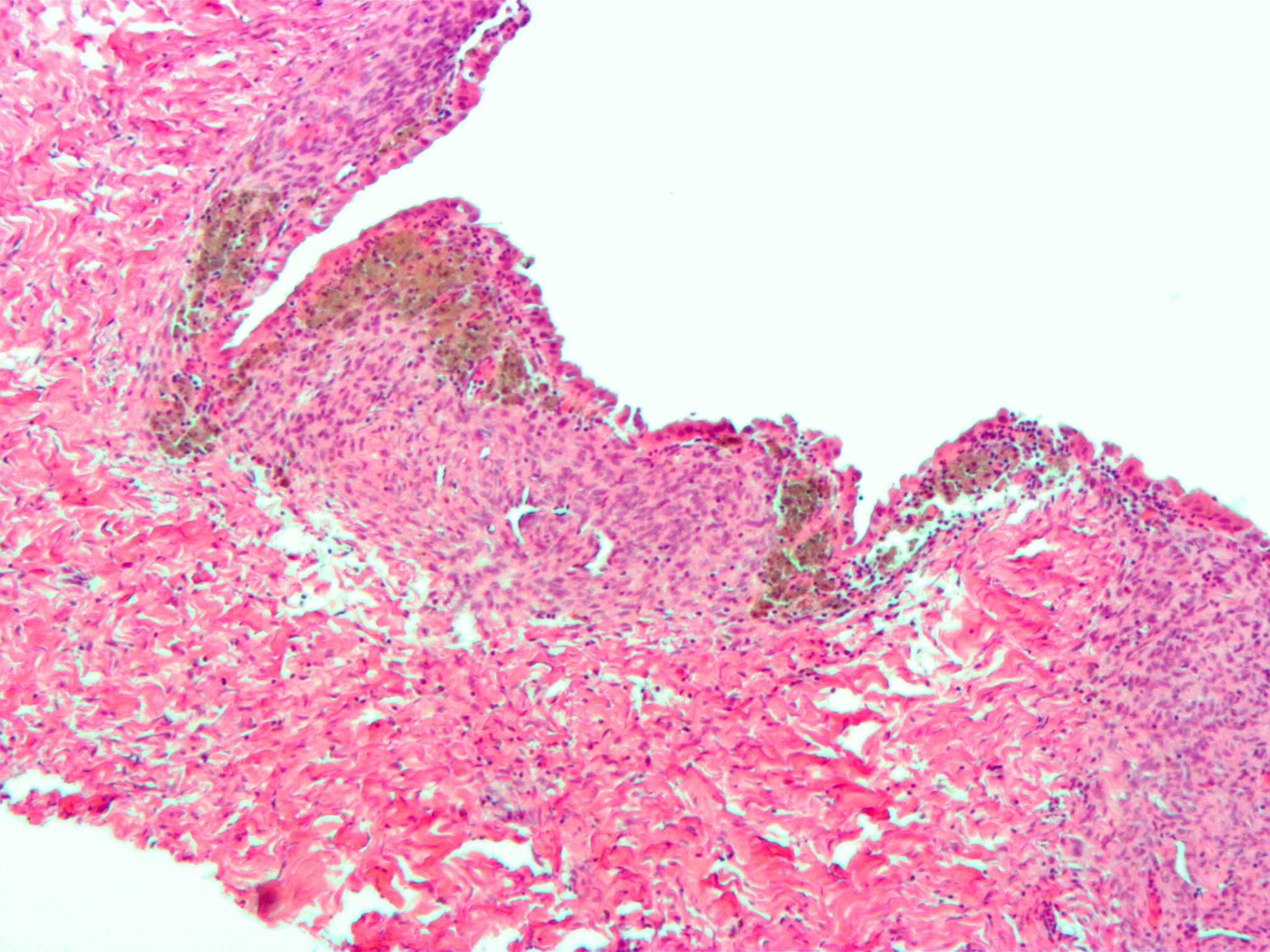
Microscope image of an endometrioma with all features of endometriosis: endometrial glands (dark purple), endometrial stroma (light purple), and iron in macrophages (brown)

=== Staging ===
Various staging or classification systems are commonly used. Endometriosis is most often staged with the revised American Society of Reproductive Medicine (rASRM) staging system. rASRM classifies endometriosis as stage I–IV, ranging from minimal (stage I) to severe (stage IV). The scale uses a point system that assesses lesions and adhesions during surgery. Stage I is characterised by a few small implants, stage II typically sees more deep implants, whereas stage III might see a smaller endometrioma and adhesions. Stage IV is characterised by dense adhesions, many deep implants, and larger endometriomas. The stages correlate poorly with infertility and pain.

The ENZIAN system is more detailed and provides a structured description of endometriosis by anatomical compartments, particularly for deep endometriosis, including the extent of lesions within each compartment. The ENZIAN system does not predict well which symptoms women have. The American Association of Gynecologic Laparoscopists (AAGL) endometriosis staging system, introduced in 2021, was designed to correlate well with the complexity of surgery. Like rASRM, it divides endometriosis into four stages. Fertility is assessed separately with the Endometriosis Fertility Index (EFI). The EFI is scored from 0 to 10, with higher scores indicating a greater likelihood of natural pregnancy.

=== Differential diagnosis ===
Various conditions exhibit similar symptoms to endometriosis. Adenomyosis, the growth of endometrium-like tissue in the muscles of the uterus, is one example. An enlarged uterus found during a physical exam can suggest adenomyosis, which is diagnosed using an ultrasound. Bladder pain syndrome (interstitial cystitis) is mainly characterized by painful urination, but also causes more diffuse pain. It can be distinguished from endometriosis by the presence of pinpoint bleeding in a cystoscopy (bladder examination). Irritable bowel syndrome can sometimes be distinguished from endometriosis via the presence of diarrhea or constipation, and can be diagnosed in the absence of endometriosis via imaging or surgery. Other conditions with overlapping symptoms are uterine fibroids, cervical stenosis, and pelvic floor myofascial pain.

== Prevention ==
According to the World Health Organization, there is no known way to prevent endometriosis. There are associations between some modifiable risk factors and endometriosis: women with endometriosis tend to consume more red meat, trans fats, alcohol, and caffeine. It is unclear whether these factors cause the disease. Physical activity does not seem to prevent endometriosis, but can lessen pain. Whether hormonal contraception can prevent endometriosis is controversial.

== Management ==
While there is no cure for endometriosis, there are treatments for pain and endometriosis-associated infertility. Pain can be treated with hormones, painkillers, or, in severe cases, surgery. The goal of management is to provide pain relief, to restrict disease progression, and to restore or preserve fertility where needed. The UK National Institute for Health and Care Excellence (NICE) recommends starting medication for those with suspected endometriosis at the same time as referral for investigations such as an ultrasound. Alternatively, treatment is started after an ultrasound. Surgery is an option when medication is insufficiently effective, for advanced disease or infertility.

=== Pain ===
==== Hormonal medications ====
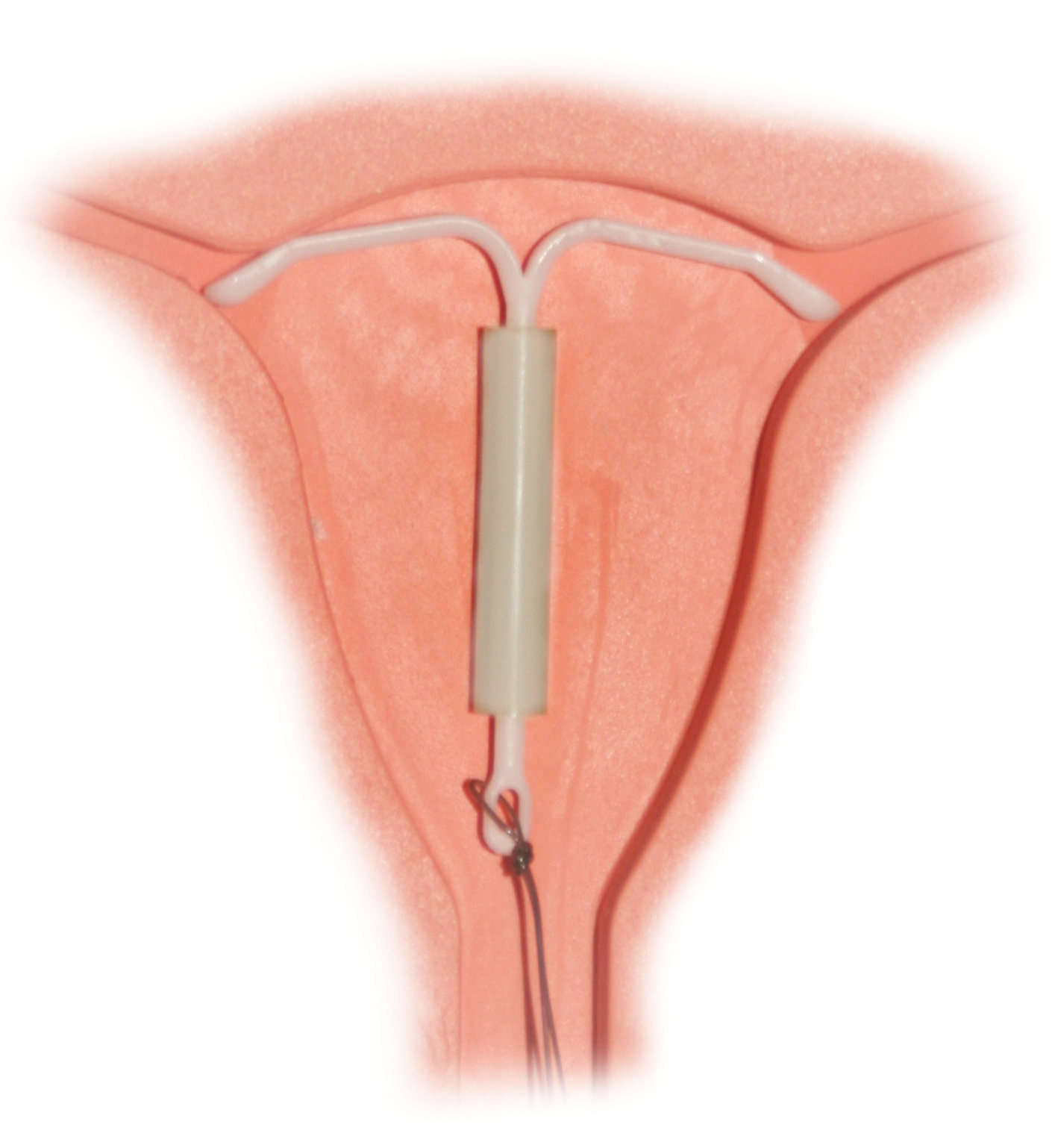
The hormonal coil is one of the treatment options for endometriosis.

The various hormonal options to treat endometriosis are similarly effective. Individuals respond differently to each medication; finding the best option often involves trial and error to balance pain relief with side effects. Hormonal treatment is not suitable for women who are trying to become pregnant.

Progestins (progestogen) are a first-line therapy. They cause endometrial tissue to die off (hormonal suppression). It comes in different forms and includes the hormonal coil (an IUD), the oral drug dienogest, an injection of medroxyprogesterone acetate every three months or an implant under the skin. Dienogest is not available on its own in the US. Oral progestins likely reduce overall pain and period pain compared to placebo, and may also help with pelvic pain. It is unclear how well they work compared to other hormonal therapies.

Combined estrogen-progestin birth control pills are another first-line treatment. They usually cause few side effects and the recommendation is to use the pills continuously to stop periods. Using the lowest level of estrogen that can still stop periods is advised. The combined pill may not be suitable for those with liver disease, migraine with aura, or those at high risk of blood clots.

Gonadotropin-releasing hormone (GnRH) modulators are second-line treatments; they include GnRH agonists, such as leuprorelin, and GnRH antagonists, such as elagolix. These drugs decrease estrogen levels. GnRH agonists mimic the effects of menopause, and seem more effective than placebo or oral progestin at reducing pain. Their side effects include decreased bone density and hot flashes. GnRH medications can be prescribed with hormonal 'add-back' therapy or with calcium-regulating agents to reduce bone loss.

Aromatase inhibitors, such as anastrozole and letrozole, are third-line treatments and block estrogen production throughout the body. Common side effects are hot flashes, night sweats, and functional cysts. Evidence is limited. In premenopausal women, these should be taken with other hormones (such as the combined pill) to prevent ovarian stimulation and menopause symptoms. They can be an option for post-menopausal women who still have endometriosis symptoms, as their action is not limited to suppressing estrogen from the ovaries.

==== Pain medication ====
Nonsteroidal anti-inflammatory drugs (NSAIDs) like naproxen or ibuprofen are anti-inflammatory medications commonly used for endometriosis pain. They are first-line treatments and can work well for mild pain. NSAIDs can be used separately (for instance, if fertility is a priority) or in combination with hormonal treatment. Evidence for their effectiveness is limited, with only one small randomized trial conducted. NSAIDs can have side effects, predominantly gastrointestinal, but they are generally safe to try. NSAIDs pose some risks for people with heart disease, kidney disease, or uncontrolled hypertension.

==== Surgery ====
Laparoscopy of the uterus and fallopian tubes. The abdomen is expanded with gas so that the surgeon can see better and have space for instruments.

Clinical guidelines recommend surgery when drug treatment does not work sufficiently, has unacceptable side effects, or should be avoided due to health risks (a contraindication). Large endometriomas can only be treated effectively with surgery. Surgery is also recommended when deep endometriosis causes problems in the bowels or urinary tract, such as obstruction. It is unclear if surgery for superficial peritoneal endometriosis relieves pain. After surgery, hormonal suppression is used to reduce risk of recurrence.

Laparoscopy (keyhole surgery) is the standard surgical approach. Small instruments are inserted through incisions to remove endometriosis lesions and restore pelvic anatomy by separating adhesions. The removal is done by excision (cutting out) or electrosurgery (coagulation or ablation/vaporization). After surgery, people can usually return home the same day.

Two literature reviews have compared excision to ablation. A 2017 literature review found that excision improved some outcomes compared to ablation for endometriosis in general. A 2021 literature review on minimal to mild endometriosis found no difference. For deep endometriosis, excision is the standard therapy, as ablation does not allow the surgeon to see if all lesions are removed.

Laser energy can also be used during laparoscopic surgery to ablate or excise endometriosis lesions. A review (2024) by the International Society for Gynecologic Endoscopy (ISGE) describes laser techniques, including CO₂, KTP and diode lasers, as enabling precise treatment while limiting damage to surrounding tissue. Because surgical treatment of ovarian endometriomas can damage ovarian follicles and reduce ovarian reserve, preserving healthy ovarian tissue is an important consideration, particularly when future fertility is desired. A systematic review and meta-analysis comparing laser vaporization with other surgical techniques for ovarian endometriomas found a higher antral follicle count following laser vaporization. For ovarian endometriomas, recommendations from the European Society for Gynaecological Endoscopy (ESGE), the European Society of Human Reproduction and Embryology (ESHRE), and the World Endometriosis Society (WES) include laser ablation among the available surgical techniques.

Endometriomas are usually cut out completely (excised). For endometriomas larger than 5 cm, the cyst is unlikely to disappear with just hormonal treatment. Compared to drainage and coagulation of the cyst, excision makes it less likely that the cysts and pain symptoms will return. For deep endometriosis, surgery improves quality of life and pain symptoms. However, the procedure can be complicated, especially if the lesions are in or near the bowel, ureter (which transports urine from the kidneys to the bladder), or the chest, and requires an interdisciplinary surgical team in those cases. For instance, for rectovaginal endometriosis, a study reported 7% of surgeries had complications. When endometriosis involves the bowel or bladder, part of the affected organ may be removed.

A hysterectomy (removal of the uterus) can be offered to women who do not want to become pregnant and still have significant pain after hormonal treatment and other surgery. This is done in combination with removal of endometriosis lesions. Removal of the uterus may be especially beneficial if the uterus itself is affected by adenomyosis. When the ovaries are removed too, women will experience early menopause and may need hormone replacement therapy. Removal of the ovaries comes with cardiovascular, metabolic, and mental health risks.

==== Additional therapies ====
There is limited knowledge about the effectiveness of additional or adjunct therapies for endometriosis. Additional therapies sometimes used are pelvic floor physical therapy, exercise, acupuncture, pain education, or psychotherapy targeting pain. Diets high in antioxidants might help reduce period pain, based on a small number of studies.

=== Infertility ===
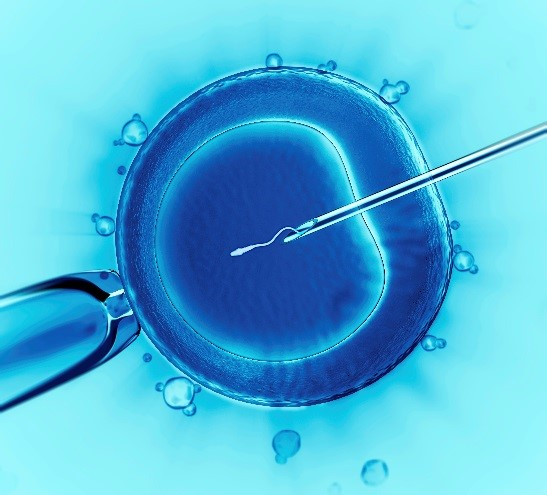
Assistive reproductive technology like IVF can help with fertility in endometriosis.

Infertility can be treated with assistive reproductive technology (ART), such as in vitro fertilization (IVF), or with surgery. IVF procedures are effective in improving fertility in many women with endometriosis. IVF is increasingly recommended over surgery for older women or for those who may have multiple reasons why they struggle to conceive. It does not increase recurrence of endometriosis. The Endometriosis Fertility Index can help guide decisions on treatment of infertility. Surgery is typically not recommended before starting ART.

Surgery to remove endometriomas can help with fertility. Draining and destroying them (ablation) may better preserve the number of remaining viable eggs (the ovarian reserve), compared to cutting out the endometrioma. Surgery likely also helps with infertility in the case of superficial peritoneal endometriosis. Receiving hormonal suppression therapy after surgery might help with endometriosis recurrence and pregnancy, but evidence for pregnancy outcomes is mixed. Both the UK's NICE and the European Society of Human Reproduction and Embryology recommend against hormonal suppression to improve fertility.

== Prognosis ==
Endometriosis is often a long-term condition, with symptoms typically emerging during adolescence and easing after menopause. For some women, pain persists after menopause. Treatments, whether medical or surgical, can alleviate symptoms but do not provide a definitive cure. In studies that tracked people over time, lesions became worse in 29%, improved in 42%, and stayed the same in 29% of cases.

Around 70% of people see initial improvements with medical therapy, but the drugs can lose their effectiveness over time. The likelihood of symptoms returning after surgery is highly variable; studies have reported recurrence rates anywhere between 6% and 67%. In an analysis with a median follow-up of 24 months, pain after surgery recurred in about 16% of women without postoperative hormonal suppression. For some, endometriosis becomes associated with persistent, complex pain, possibly linked to changes in the nervous system, as part of a constellation of chronic pain disorders.

Hormonal therapy before surgery has little effect on recurrence, but treatment afterwards makes recurrence less likely. At a median follow-up of 18 months (range: 12–36 months), the recurrence of endometriosis—primarily defined as the return of endometriomas—reached 26% in women without postoperative hormonal suppression, compared with 10% of women who received it. Postoperative hormonal suppression also slightly reduced pain recurrence.

Risk factors for recurrence of pain and lesions after surgery include young age, pre-surgery pain, whether adhesions were present, and higher stage endometriosis. A more conservative surgical technique or insufficient hormonal suppression after surgery are also associated with recurrence. A larger endometrioma is linked to a higher risk of cyst recurrence.

== Epidemiology ==
Endometriosis is commonly reported to affect approximately 10% of women of reproductive age. Worldwide, this corresponds to nearly 200 million girls and women. Around 22 million had a surgically confirmed diagnosis as of 2021. It is difficult to determine an exact prevalence, given the large delays in diagnosis and the need for a surgical confirmation for a definite diagnosis. Prevalence estimates also vary according to the population studied and the diagnostic method used. Estimates tend to be highest in studies based on laparoscopy, lower in studies using imaging, and lowest in studies relying on self-reported diagnoses.

Of women seeking help for chronic pelvic pain, endometriosis is found in around 28%. Of those seeking help for infertility, that number is 25%. A meta-analysis reported that over half of women with endometriosis had stage I endometriosis. Stage II was found in around 17% of cases, whereas stage III and stage IV were each seen in around 13%.

The disease is typically diagnosed when women are in their 30s, but symptoms typically start in the early 20s or in adolescence. People can develop endometriosis symptoms before their first period or in menopause. Up to 4% of women still have endometriosis after reaching menopause, most commonly in the form of ovarian endometriosis. The prevalence in trans men is comparable to that in women, at around 9%.

Historically, the disease was considered more prevalent among white women than black women and in the United States, the condition is still more commonly diagnosed in white women. This may reflect health inequities rather than true differences in prevalence, as disadvantaged groups have poorer access to healthcare, in particular to diagnostic surgery.

== History ==
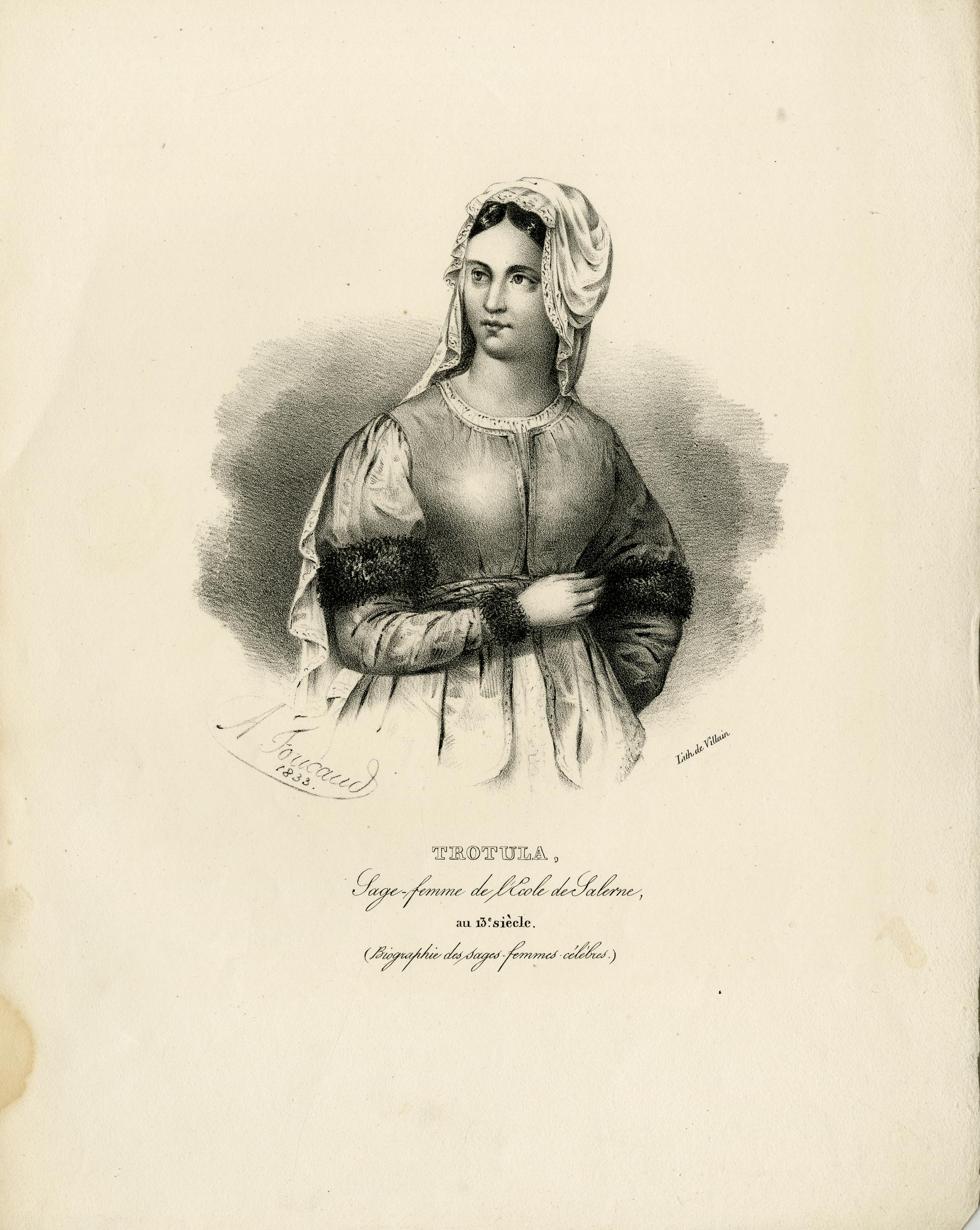
Trota of Salerno, an early medieval physician, suggested ground goat testicles as a treatment for "uterine suffocation", a concept that is consistent with endometriosis.

In Ancient Greece, the Hippocratic Corpus—written between the 5th and 4th centuries BCE—outlines symptoms similar to endometriosis, including adhesions and infertility. Over the centuries, numerous explanations for pelvic pain in women were proposed, often attributing the condition to supposed flaws in women themselves, such as madness, promiscuity, or inherent weakness. Many women who received the now-discredited diagnosis of hysteria may have instead suffered from endometriosis.

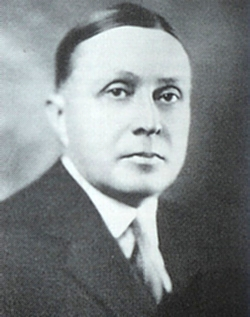
John A. Sampson, who defined endometriosis

Endometriosis proper was first defined in the late 19th century or early 20th century. Some attribute the first description to Carl von Rokitansky in 1860, who found endometrial glands in tissues using a microscope. Other authors consider it more likely he was describing malignant tissue, given his use of the term sarcoma, which already then referred to cancer. Around 1896, Thomas Cullen and others described endometriosis and adenomyosis under the single name "adenomyoma". Between 1903 and 1920, Cullen showed that the tissue in adenomyomas was endometrial. John A. Sampson defined endometriosis in 1932. He studied its pathogenesis and was the first to propose retrograde menstruation as a cause. He also suggested that endometrial tissue could be inadvertently transplanted during surgery, such as a Caesarean section. During operations, he observed that endometriotic lesions would bleed in sync with a woman's menstrual cycle.

One early recommendation to prevent and treat endometriosis was pregnancy. For older women, another approach was surgery, involving oophorectomy (removal of the ovaries) and hysterectomy (removal of the uterus). In the 1940s, the only available hormonal therapies for endometriosis were high-dose testosterone and high-dose estrogen therapy. Success of high-dose estrogen therapy with diethylstilbestrol for endometriosis was first reported by Karnaky in 1948, but was associated with severe side effects, including risks upon withdrawal.

Pseudopregnancy (high-dose estrogen–progestogen therapy simulating pregnancy) for endometriosis was first described by Kistner and Andrews in the late 1950s and became widely employed. Danazol was first described for endometriosis in 1971. It was used for some 40 years, but had masculinizing side effects, including weight gain, excessive body hair growth, and shrinking of breasts. From the 1990s, GnRH agonists gained prominence for the treatment of endometriosis, but had disadvantages: They needed to be administered either nasally or via injections and were slow to act. Oral fast-acting GnRH antagonists, such as elagolix, were introduced for endometriosis in 2018.

== Society and culture ==
=== Stigma and medical culture ===
Multiple forms of stigma related to fertility, pain, and menstruation, contribute to dismissal of symptoms, delayed diagnosis, and poor mental health outcomes in individuals with endometriosis. Menstrual stigma contributes by discouraging discussion among peers and by casting doubt on accounts of period pain. There can also be stigma around painful sex. Cultural norms can reinforce these barriers. There have been reports in the UK and Australia of women being denied transvaginal ultrasounds because they have unperforated hymens or are not sexually active. In India, unmarried women are often not offered a transvaginal ultrasound because of taboos about sex before marriage. This causes delays in diagnosis.

Race and ethnicity can impact how endometriosis affects one's life. For instance, in the United States the stereotype that non-white women have a higher pain threshold than white women may reduce quality of care. Cultural attitudes also play a role; in a 2020 Puerto Rican study, stigma led to endometriosis pain being dismissed by friends and family as changaría or changas, local terms for whining or complaining that are often directed at children.

Further barriers to treatment come from outdated standards for laparoscopic evaluation and lack of understanding of the disease. Healthcare providers sometimes dismiss described symptoms as normal menstruation, or psychologize the issue (ascribing the pain to a psychological cause). Awareness among primary care providers (family doctors or GPs) is often limited, leading to delayed referrals to gynecologists in countries where women cannot self-refer.

=== Economic burden ===
The economic burden of endometriosis is substantial. Direct costs of endometriosis include the cost of treating the disease, while indirect costs include the loss of work days and treatment of associated conditions such as depression or chronic pain. Surgery is the main component of medical costs. Cost estimates vary greatly between countries: Annual productivity losses ranged from $293 per affected person in Nigeria to $33,428 in Italy (in 2022 currency values), while annual direct medical costs ranged from $1459 to $20,239 per woman. Endometriosis impacts many women's ability to work: A survey of Swedish women with endometriosis found that 32% missed work because of the disease; a survey of Puerto Rican women put that number at 60% and found that 20% of women could not work at all.

== Research ==
=== Research funding ===
Like many conditions mainly affecting women, endometriosis research is underfunded relative to its disease burden, whereas some male dominated conditions such as HIV/AIDS and tuberculosis, receive funding well above theirs. For example, in the US, between 2015 and 2019 the NIH spent 5 to 10 times less on endometriosis research per healthy life year lost than on the average condition. Between the 1980s and 2023, there were only ten research projects funded by the European Union research programmes specifically dedicated to endometriosis. Measured by publications rather than funded projects, research activity on endometriosis has grown substantially; a bibliometric analysis identified 21,336 articles published between 2002 and 2021, with annual output exceeding 1,000 articles from 2013 to 2021 and 2,075 published in 2021 alone.

One widely criticized study evaluated how physically attractive men found women with and without endometriosis. The study, published in 2013, was retracted in 2020. Only "Caucasian" women were studied and they were not informed they would be judged based on their attractiveness. Another study, part of a larger research project examining the impact of endometriosis on women, men, and couples, looked specifically at the impact on male partners, finding that the condition "significantly impacts men across several life domains and can negatively impact [men's] emotional well-being."

=== Research directions ===
A major area of research is the search for endometriosis biomarkers (such as something detectable in a blood test), which could help with earlier diagnosis. Studies have examined potential biomarkers such as microRNAs, glycoproteins, and immune markers in blood, menstrual, and urine samples, but none have shown the high accuracy needed for clinical use. CA-125, a tumor marker, has been studied extensively. It is elevated in endometriosis, but also in many other conditions, so it cannot be used on its own. The combination of biomarkers, for instance various microRNA markers and CA-125, is a promising direction, as is the use of machine learning.

Medical management of endometriosis is typically based on hormonal therapy, but these treatments can produce undesirable side effects, driving the search for alternatives. Emerging strategies target endometriosis as an inflammatory, metabolic, or pain disorder. Anti-inflammatory research targets include anakinra, a drug used for rheumatoid arthritis. The cancer drug dichloroacetic acid is being explored for its potential metabolic effects on endometriosis. Pain-focused treatments under investigation include cannabinoid extracts, migraine medications, and therapies directed at affected nerves.

Little research has been done on the molecular differences between lesions. Classifying lesions might make it possible to design more targeted therapies, an approach that has worked well for cancer. Endometriosis has been studied in a large variety of animal models (e.g. mice developed to have endometriosis), but their tissue can differ substantially from human endometriosis. One alternative is the use of organoids, miniature organs derived from the cells of women with endometriosis, which can be studied in vitro.

== See also ==
- Worldwide Endometriosis March
