= Phenotype =

Composite of the organism's observable characteristics or traits

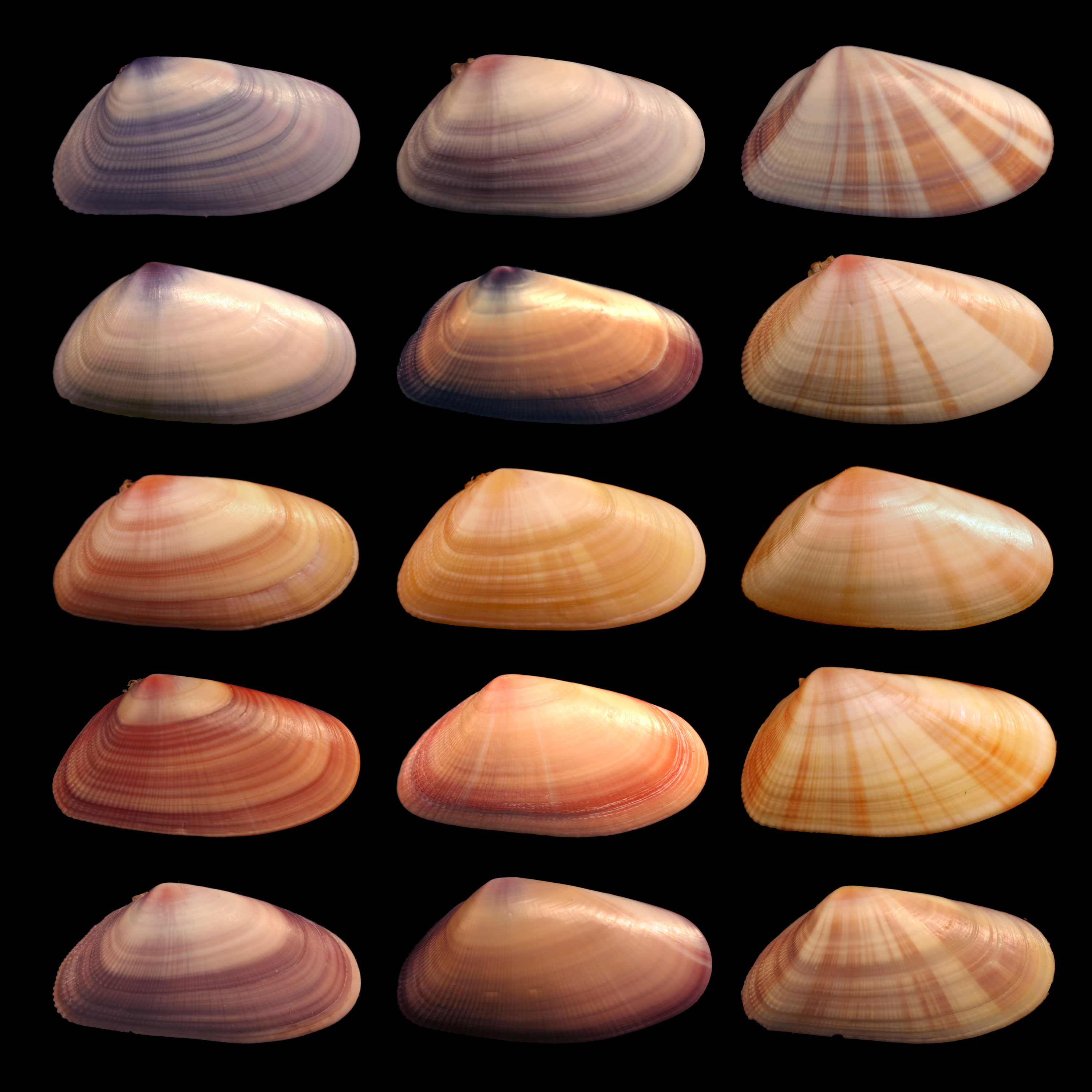
The shells of individuals within the bivalve mollusk species Donax variabilis show diverse coloration and patterning in their phenotypes.

Here the relation between genotype and phenotype is illustrated, using a Punnett square, for the character of petal color in pea plants. The letters B and b represent genes for color, and the pictures show the resultant phenotypes. This shows how multiple genotypes (BB and Bb) may yield the same phenotype (purple petals).

In genetics, the phenotype (from Ancient Greek φαίνω (phaínō) 'to appear, show' and τύπος (túpos) 'mark, type') is the set of observable characteristics or traits of an organism. The term covers all traits of an organism other than its genome, however transitory: the organism's morphology (physical form and structure), its developmental processes, its biochemical and physiological properties whether reversible or irreversible, and all its behavior, such as a peacock's display.

An organism's phenotype results from two basic factors: the expression of an organism's unique profile of genes (its genotype) and the influence of environmental factors experienced by that same organism which influence the variable expression of said genes, and thereby shape the resulting profile of defining traits. Since the developmental process is a complex interplay of gene-environment, gene-gene interactions, there is a high degree of phenotypic variation in a given population that extends beyond mere genotypic variation.

A well-documented example of polymorphism is Labrador Retriever coloring; while the coat color depends on many genes, it is clearly seen in the environment as yellow, black, and brown. Richard Dawkins in 1978 and again in his 1982 book The Extended Phenotype suggested that one can regard bird nests and other built structures such as caddisfly larva cases and beaver dams as "extended phenotypes".

Wilhelm Johannsen proposed the genotype–phenotype distinction in 1911 to make clear the difference between an organism's hereditary material and 'all the typical phenomena of the organic world', the description of which, with regard 'to forms, structures, sizes, colors and other characters of the living organisms has been the chief aim of natural history'. The distinction somewhat resembles that proposed by August Weismann (1834–1914), who distinguished between germ plasm (heredity) and somatic cells (the body). More recently in The Selfish Gene (1976), Dawkins redescribed these concepts as replicators and vehicles.

== Definition ==
The concept of the phenotype has non-visual subtleties. Generally, anything dependent on the genotype is a phenotype, including molecules such as RNA and proteins. Most molecules and structures coded by the genetic material are not visible in the appearance of an organism, yet they are observable (for example by Western blotting) and are thus part of the phenotype; human blood groups are an example. It may seem that this goes beyond the original intentions of the concept with its focus on the (living) organism in itself. Either way, the term phenotype includes inherent traits or characteristics that are observable or traits that can be made visible by some technical procedure.

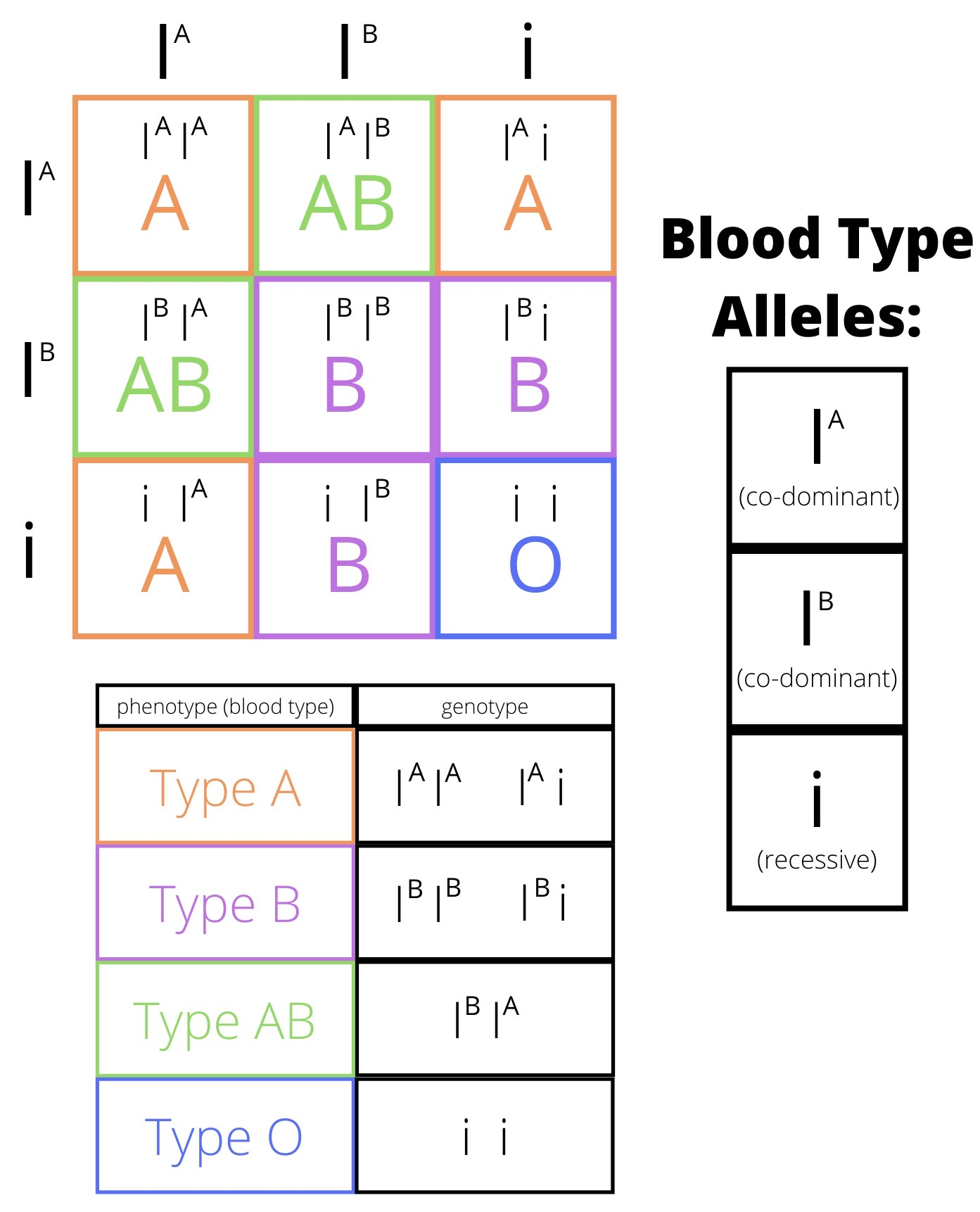
ABO blood groups determined through a Punnett square and displaying phenotypes and genotypes

The term "phenotype" has sometimes been incorrectly used as a shorthand for the phenotypic difference between a mutant and its wild type, which would lead to the false statement that a "mutation has no phenotype".

Behaviors and their consequences are also phenotypes, since behaviors are observable characteristics. Behavioral phenotypes include cognitive, personality, and behavioral patterns. Some behavioral phenotypes may characterize psychiatric disorders or syndromes.

A phenome is the set of all traits expressed by a cell, tissue, organ, organism, or species. The term was first used by Davis in 1949, "We here propose the name phenome for the sum total of extragenic, non-autoreproductive portions of the cell, whether cytoplasmic or nuclear. The phenome would be the material basis of the phenotype, just as the genome is the material basis of the genotype." Although phenome has been in use for many years, the distinction between the use of phenome and phenotype is problematic. A proposed definition for both terms as the "physical totality of all traits of an organism or of one of its subsystems" was put forth by Mahner and Kary in 1997, who argue that although scientists tend to intuitively use these and related terms in a manner that does not impede research, the terms are not well defined and usage of the terms is not consistent.

Some usages of the term suggest that the phenome of a given organism is best understood as a kind of matrix of data representing physical manifestation of phenotype. For example, discussions led by A. Varki among those who had used the term up to 2003 suggested the following definition: "The body of information describing an organism's phenotypes, under the influences of genetic and environmental factors". Another team of researchers characterize "the human phenome [as] a multidimensional search space with several neurobiological levels, spanning the proteome, cellular systems (e.g., signaling pathways), neural systems and cognitive and behavioural phenotypes." Plant biologists have begun to explore the phenome in the study of plant physiology. In 2009, a research team demonstrated the feasibility of identifying genotype–phenotype associations using electronic health records (EHRs) linked to DNA biobanks. They called this method phenome-wide association study (PheWAS).

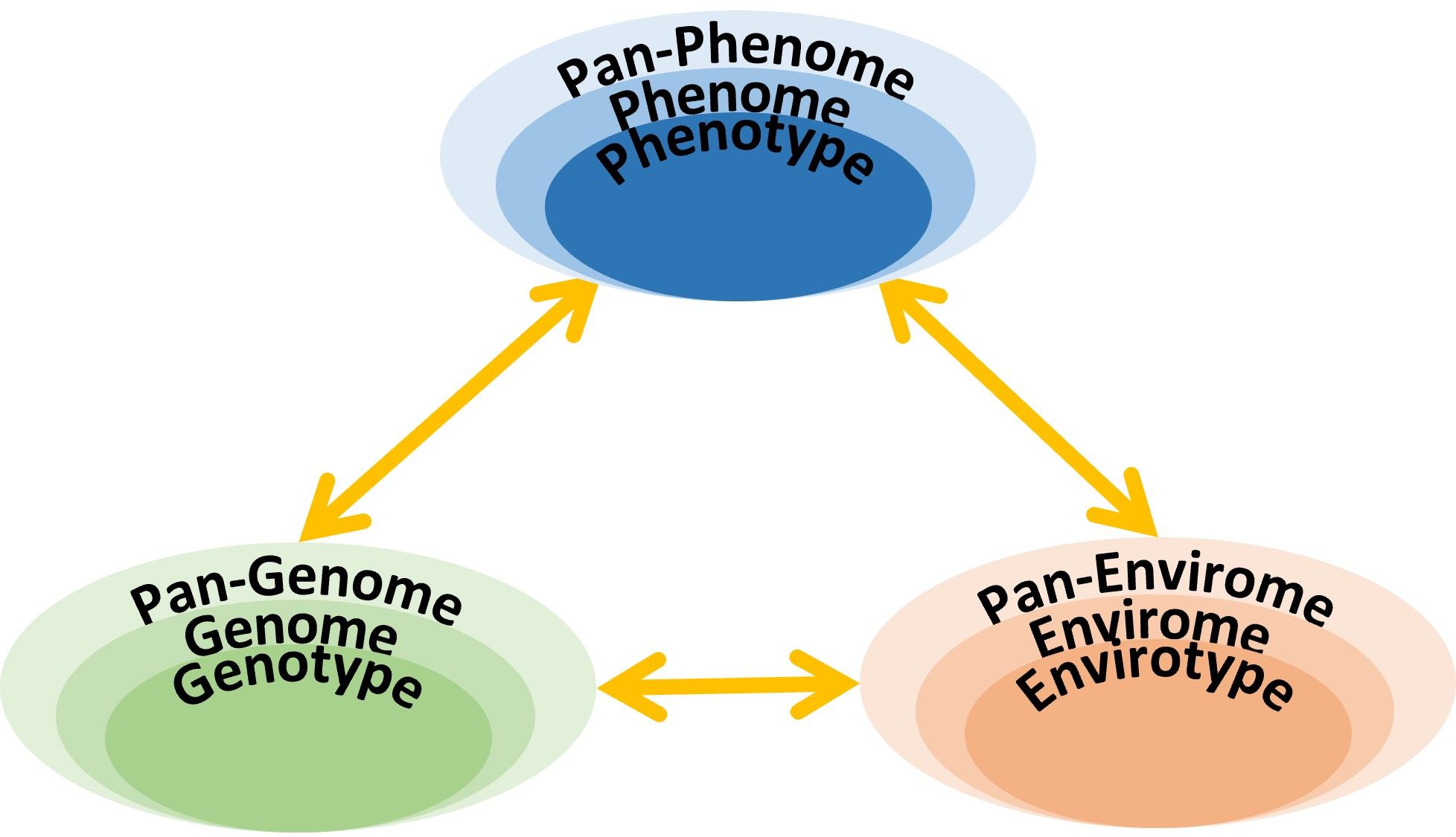
Exploring relationships among phenotype, genotype and environment at different levels

Inspired by the evolution from genotype to genome to pan-genome, a concept of eventually exploring the relationship among pan-phenome, pan-genome, and pan-envirome was proposed in 2023.

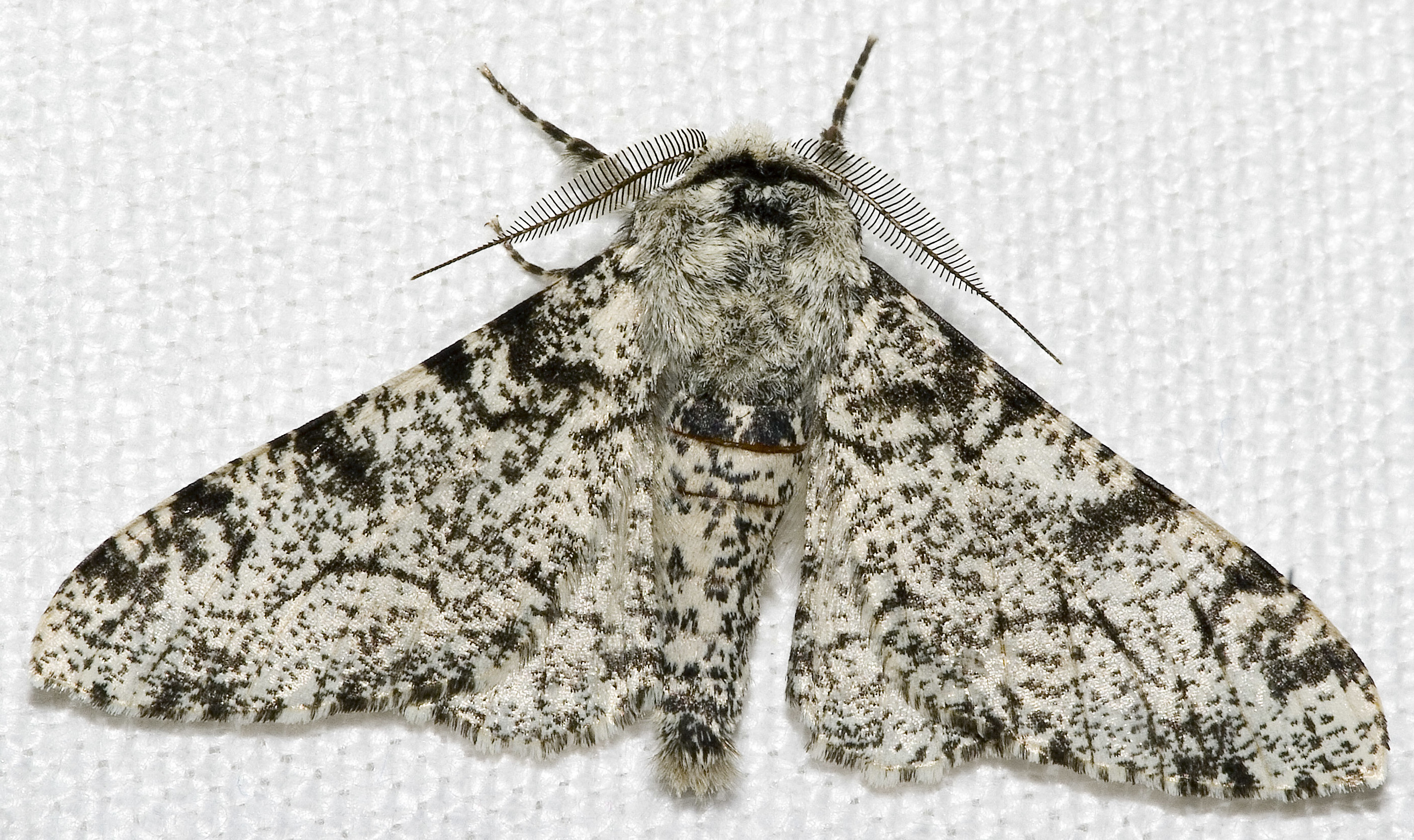
Biston betularia morpha typica, the standard light-colored peppered moth

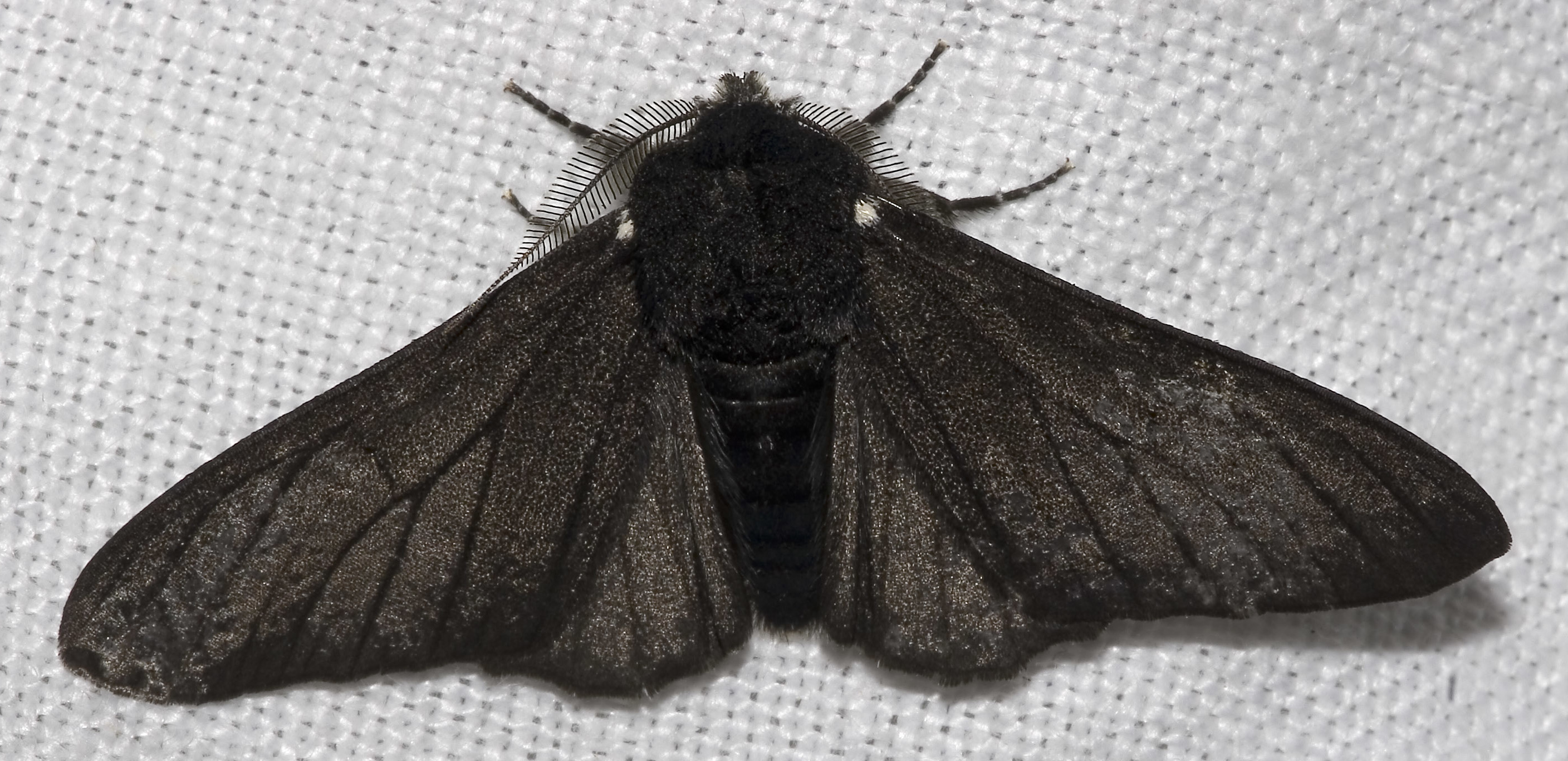
B.betularia morpha carbonaria, the melanic form, illustrating discontinuous variation

== Phenotypic variation ==
Phenotypic variation is a fundamental prerequisite for evolution by natural selection. Not all phenotypic variation is caused by underlying heritable genetic variation. This is because the organization of living things is 'plastic', as Darwin emphasized, or 'readily capable of change.' It is the living organism as a whole that interacts with the environment and so contributes (or not) to the next generation. Thus, natural selection affects the genetic structure of a population indirectly via the contribution of phenotypes. Without phenotypic variation, there would be no evolution by natural selection.

The interaction between genotype and phenotype has often been conceptualized without reference to living organisms, as in the following relationship:

genotype (G) + environment (E) → phenotype (P)

But a genotype can only be affected by or affect the environment insofar as it is embodied in a living organism. Hence, a more nuanced version of the relationship is:

genotype (G) + organism & environment interactions (OE) → phenotype (P)

Phenotypes often show much flexibility or phenotypic plasticity in the expression of genotypes; in many organisms the phenotypes which 'express' a given genotype are very different under varying environmental conditions. The plant Hieracium umbellatum is found growing in two different habitats in Sweden. One habitat is rocky, sea-side cliffs, where the plants develop to be bushy with broad leaves and expanded inflorescences; the other is among sand dunes where the plants develop to lie prostrate with narrow leaves and compact inflorescences. The habitats alternate along the coast of Sweden and the habitat that seeds containing the identical genotype of Hieracium umbellatum land in, determines the phenotype which develops.

An example of random variation in Drosophila flies is the number of ommatidia, which may vary (randomly) between left and right eyes in a single individual as much as they do between different genotypes overall, or between clones raised in different environments.

The concept of phenotype can be extended to variations below the level of the gene which affect an organism's fitness. For example, silent mutations that do not change the corresponding amino acid sequence of a gene may change the frequency of guanine-cytosine base pairs (GC content). The base pairs have a higher thermal stability (melting point) than adenine-thymine, a property that might convey, among organisms living in high-temperature environments, a selective advantage on variants enriched in GC content.

=== The extended phenotype ===
Richard Dawkins described a phenotype that included all effects that a gene has on its surroundings, including other organisms, as an extended phenotype, arguing that "An animal's behavior tends to maximize the survival of the genes 'for' that behavior, whether or not those genes happen to be in the body of the particular animal performing it." For instance, an organism such as a beaver modifies its environment by building a beaver dam; this can be considered an expression of its genes, just as its incisor teeth are—which it uses to modify its environment. Similarly, when a bird feeds a brood parasite such as a cuckoo, it is unwittingly extending its phenotype; and when genes in an orchid affect orchid bee behavior to increase pollination, or when genes in a peacock affect the copulatory decisions of peahens, again, the phenotype is being extended. Genes are, in Dawkins's view, selected by their phenotypic effects.

Other biologists broadly agree that the extended phenotype concept is relevant, but consider that its role is largely explanatory, rather than assisting in the design of experimental tests.

== Genes and phenotypes ==
An organism's phenotype is determined by the sum of its genetic material along with the influence of its environment. This is mediated by a range of biological mechanisms: either the direct activities of gene products or their downstream effects.

Phenotypes develop through an interaction of genes and their immediate cellular environment, the cellular environment being under the influence of the host-organism's interaction with its environment. Thus there is a multiplicity of ways that genes and phenotypes interact. Most simply, for example, we might say an albino phenotype develops as a consequence of a mutation in the gene encoding tyrosinase which is a key enzyme in melanin formation. Even here, however, exposure to UV radiation can increase melanin production, hence the environment plays a role in this phenotype as well. For most complex phenotypes the precise genetic mechanism remains unknown.

Gene expression plays a crucial role in determining the phenotypes of organisms. The level of gene expression can affect the phenotype of an organism. For example, if a gene that codes for a particular enzyme is expressed at high levels, the organism may produce more of that enzyme and exhibit a particular trait as a result. On the other hand, if the gene is expressed at low levels, the organism may produce less of the enzyme and exhibit a different trait. Gene expression is regulated at various levels and thus each level can affect certain phenotypes, including transcriptional and post-transcriptional regulation.

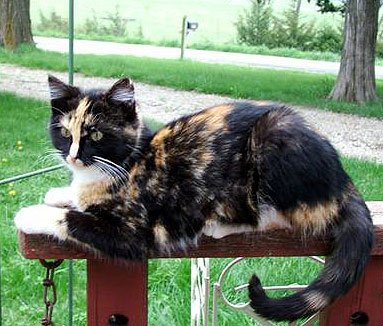
The patchy colors of a tortoiseshell cat are the result of different levels of expression of pigmentation genes in different areas of the skin.

Changes in the levels of gene expression can be influenced by a variety of factors, such as environmental conditions, genetic variations, and epigenetic modifications. These modifications can be influenced by environmental factors such as diet, stress, and exposure to toxins, and can have a significant impact on an individual's phenotype. Some phenotypes may be the result of changes in gene expression due to these factors, rather than changes in genotype. An experiment involving machine learning methods utilizing gene expressions measured from RNA sequencing found that they can contain enough signal to separate individuals in the context of phenotype prediction.

== Phenome and phenomics ==
Although a phenotype is the ensemble of observable characteristics displayed by an organism, the word phenome is sometimes used to refer to a collection of traits, while the simultaneous study of such a collection is referred to as phenomics. Phenomics is an important field of study because it can be used to figure out which genomic variants affect phenotypes which then can be used to explain things like health, disease, and evolutionary fitness. Phenomics forms a large part of the Human Genome Project.

Phenomics has applications in agriculture. For instance, genomic variations such as drought and heat resistance can be identified through phenomics to create more durable GMOs. Phenomics may be a stepping stone towards personalized medicine, particularly drug therapy. Once the phenomic database has acquired enough data, a person's phenomic information can be used to select specific drugs tailored to the individual.

== Large-scale phenotyping and genetic screens ==
Large-scale genetic screens can identify the genes or mutations that affect the phenotype of an organism. Analyzing the phenotypes of mutant genes can also aid in determining gene function. Most genetic screens have used microorganisms, in which genes can be easily deleted. For instance, nearly all genes have been deleted in E. coli and many other bacteria, but also in several eukaryotic model organisms such as baker's yeast and fission yeast. Among other discoveries, such studies have revealed lists of essential genes.

More recently, large-scale phenotypic screens have also been used in animals, e.g., to study lesser understood phenotypes such as behavior. In one screen, the role of mutations in mice were studied in areas including learning and memory, circadian rhythmicity, vision, responses to stress, and response to psychostimulants.

Large-scale mutagenesis and phenotypic screens for the nervous system and behavior in mice
Phenotypic domain	Assay	Notes	Software package
Circadian Rhythm	Wheel running behavior		ClockLab
Learning and Memory	Fear conditioning	Video-image-based scoring of freezing	FreezeFrame
Preliminary Assessment	Open field activity and elevated plus maze	Video-image-based scoring of exploration	LimeLight
Psychostimulant response	Hyperlocomotion behavior	Video-image-based tracking of locomotion	BigBrother
Vision	Electroretinogram and Fundus photography		L. Pinto and colleagues

This experiment involves the progeny of mice treated with ENU, or N-ethyl-N-nitrosourea, which is a potent mutagen that causes point mutations. The mice were phenotypically screened for alterations in the different behavioral domains in order to find the number of putative mutants (see table for details). Putative mutants are then tested for heritability in order to help determine the inheritance pattern as well as map out the mutations. Once they have been mapped out, cloned, and identified, it can be determined whether a mutation represents a new gene or not.

Phenotypic domain	ENU progeny screened	Putative mutants	Putative mutant lines with progeny	Confirmed mutants
General assessment	29860	80	38	14
Learning and memory	23123	165	106	19
Psychostimulant response	20997	168	86	9
Neuroendocrine response to stress	13118	126	54	2
Vision	15582	108	60	6

These experiments show that mutations in the rhodopsin gene affected vision and can even cause retinal degeneration in mice. The same amino acid change causes human familial blindness, showing how phenotyping in animals can inform medical diagnostics and possibly therapy.

== Evolutionary origin of phenotype ==
The RNA world is the hypothesized pre-cellular stage in the evolutionary history of life on earth, in which self-replicating RNA molecules proliferated prior to the evolution of DNA and proteins. The folded three-dimensional physical structure of the first RNA molecule that possessed ribozyme activity promoting replication while avoiding destruction would have been the first phenotype, and the nucleotide sequence of the first self-replicating RNA molecule would have been the original genotype.

== See also ==
- Bioinformatics
- Ecotype
- Endophenotype
- Genotype–phenotype distinction
- Molecular phenotyping
- Phenomics
- Phenotypic trait
- Phylotype – Observed similarity used to classify organisms
- Physiome
- Physiomics
- Race and genetics
- Systems biology
- List of omics topics in biology
