= Molecular phenotyping =

Molecular phenotyping describes the technique of quantifying pathway reporter genes, i.e. pre-selected genes that are modulated specifically by metabolic and signaling pathways, in order to infer activity of these pathways.

In most cases, molecular phenotyping quantifies changes of pathway reporter gene expression to characterize modulation of pathway activities induced by perturbations such as therapeutic agents or stress in a cellular system in vitro. In such contexts, measurements at early time points are often more informative than later observations because they capture the primary response to the perturbation by the cellular system. Integrated with quantified changes of phenotype induced by the perturbation, molecular phenotyping can identify pathways that contribute to the phenotypic changes.

Currently molecular phenotyping uses RNA sequencing and mRNA expression to infer pathway activities. Other technologies and readouts such as mass spectrometry and protein abundance or phosphorylation levels can be potentially used as well.

== Application in early drug discovery ==
Current data suggest that by quantifying pathway reporter gene expression, molecular phenotyping is able to cluster compounds based on pathway profiles and dissect associations between pathway activities and disease phenotypes simultaneously. Furthermore, molecular phenotyping can be applicable to compounds with a range of binding specificities and is able to triage false positives derived from high-content screening assays. Furthermore, molecular phenotyping allows integration of data derived from in vitro and in vivo models as well as patient data into the drug discovery process.
