= List of diseases (R) =

This is a list of diseases starting with the letter "R".

== Ra ==
=== Rab–Rai ===
- Rabies
- Rabson–Mendenhall syndrome
- Radial defect Robin sequence
- Radial hypoplasia, triphalangeal thumbs and hypospadias
- Radial ray agenesis
- Radial ray hypoplasia choanal atresia
- Radiation induced angiosarcoma of the breast
- Radiation induced meningioma
- Radiation leukemia
- Radiation related neoplasm /cancer
- Radiation syndromes
- Radiation-induced brachial plexopathy
- Radiation-induced lumbosacral plexopathy
- Radiculomegaly of canine teeth congenital cataract
- Radio digito facial dysplasia
- Radio renal syndrome
- Radiophobia
- Radioulnar synostosis mental retardation hypotonia
- Radioulnar synostosis retinal pigment abnormalities
- Radio-ulnar synostosis type 1
- Radio-ulnar synostosis type 2
- Radius absent anogenital anomalies
- Raine syndrome

=== Ram–Ray ===
- Rambam Hasharon syndrome
- Rambaud–Galian syndrome
- Ramer–Ladda syndrome
- Ramon syndrome
- Ramos-Arroyo syndrome
- Ramsay Hunt paralysis syndrome
- Rapadilino syndrome
- Rapp–Hodgkin syndrome
- Rapunzel syndrome
- Rasmussen's encephalitis
- Rasmussen–Johnsen–Thomsen syndrome
- Rasmussen subacute encephalitis
- Ray–Peterson–Scott syndrome
- Raynaud's disease/phenomenon
- Rayner–Lampert–Rennert syndrome

== Re ==
=== Rea–Reg ===
- Reactive airway disease
- Reactive arthritis
- Reactive attachment disorder (RAD)

- Reactive attachment disorder of early childhood
- Reactive attachment disorder of infancy

- Reactive hypoglycemia
- Reardon–Hall–Slaney syndrome
- Reardon–Wilson–Cavanagh syndrome
- Rectal neoplasm
- Rectophobia
- Rectosigmoid neoplasm
- Recurrent laryngeal papillomas
- Recurrent miscarriage
- Recurrent peripheral facial palsy
- Recurrent respiratory papillomatosis
- Reductional transverse limb defects
- Reflex sympathetic dystrophy syndrome
- Reflux esophagitis
- Refractory anemia
- Refsum disease, infantile form
- Refsum disease
- Reginato–Shiapachasse syndrome
- Regional enteritis

=== Rei ===
- Reifenstein syndrome
- Reinhardt–Pfeiffer syndrome

=== Ren ===
==== Rena ====
===== Renal =====
====== Renal a – Renal g ======
- Renal adysplasia dominant type
- Renal agenesis meningomyelocele Müllerian defect
- Renal agenesis, bilateral
- Renal agenesis
- Renal artery stenosis
- Renal calculi
- Renal caliceal diverticuli deafness
- Renal cancer
- Renal carcinoma, familial
- Renal cell carcinoma
- Renal dysplasia diffuse autosomal recessive
- Renal dysplasia diffuse cystic
- Renal dysplasia limb defects
- Renal dysplasia megalocystis sirenomelia
- Renal dysplasia mesomelia radiohumeral fusion
- Renal failure
- Renal genital middle ear anomalies
- Renal glycosuria

====== Renal h – Renal t ======
- Renal hepatic pancreatic dysplasia Dandy Walker cyst
- Renal hypoplasia
- Renal hypertension
- Renal osteodystrophy
- Renal rickets
- Renal tubular acidosis progressive nerve deafness
- Renal tubular acidosis, distal, autosomal dominant
- Renal tubular acidosis, distal, autosomal recessive
- Renal tubular acidosis, distal, type 3
- Renal tubular acidosis, distal, type 4
- Renal tubular acidosis, distal
- Renal tubular acidosis
- Renal tubular transport disorders inborn

==== Reni–Reno ====
- Renier–Gabreels–Jasper syndrome
- Renoanogenital syndrome
- Renoprival hypertension

=== Rep–Res ===
- Reperfusion injury
- Repetitive strain injury (RSI)
- Resistance to LH (luteinizing hormone)
- Resistance to thyroid stimulating hormone
- Respiratory acidosis
- Respiratory chain deficiency malformations
- Respiratory distress syndrome, adult
- Respiratory distress syndrome, infant
- Respiratory syncytial virus
- Restless legs syndrome

==== Reti–Retr ====
- Reticuloendotheliosis
- Retina disorder
- Retinal degeneration
- Retinal dysplasia X linked
- Retinal telangiectasia hypogammaglobulinemia
- Retinitis pigmentosa

- Retinitis pigmentosa-deafness
- Retinis pigmentosa deafness hypogenitalism
- Retinitis pigmentosa mental retardation deafness

- Retinoblastoma
- Retinohepatoendocrinologic syndrome
- Retinopathy anemia CNS anomalies
- Retinopathy aplastic anemia neurological abnormalities
- Retinopathy pigmentary mental retardation
- Retinopathy, arteriosclerotic
- Retinopathy, diabetic
- Retinoschisis

- Retinoschisis, juvenile
- Retinoschisis, X-linked

- Retrograde amnesia
- Retrolental fibroplasia
- Retroperitoneal fibrosis
- Retroperitoneal liposarcoma

==== Rett ====
- Rett like syndrome
- Rett syndrome

=== Rev–Rey ===
- Revesz syndrome
- Reye's syndrome
- Reynolds–Neri–Hermann syndrome
- Reynolds syndrome

== Rh ==
- Rh disease
- Rhabditida infections
- Rhabdoid tumor
- Rhabdomyolysis
- Rhabdomyomatous dysplasia cardiopathy genital anomalies
- Rhabdomyosarcoma

- Rhabdomyosarcoma 1
- Rhabdomyosarcoma 2
- Rhabdomyosarcoma, alveolar
- Rhabdomyosarcoma, embryonal

- Rheumatic fever
- Rheumatism
- Rheumatoid arthritis
- Rheumatoid purpura
- Rheumatoid vasculitis
- Rhinotillexomania
- Rhizomelic dysplasia type Patterson–Lowry
- Rhizomelic pseudopolyarthritis
- Rhizomelic syndrome
- Rhypophobia
- Rhytiphobia

== Ri ==
=== Rib–Rig ===
- Ribbing disease
- Richards–Rundle syndrome
- Richieri–Costa–Colletto–Otto syndrome
- Richieri–Costa–Da Silva syndrome
- Richieri–Costa–Gorlin syndrome
- Richieri–Costa–Guion–Almeida syndrome

- Richieri–Costa–Guion–Almeida acrofacial dysostosis
- Richieri–Costa–Guion–Almeida–Cohen syndrome
- Richieri–Costa–Guion–Almeida dwarfism
- Richieri–Costa–Guion–Almeida–Rodini syndrome

- Richieri–Costa–Montagnoli syndrome
- Richieri–Costa–Orquizas syndrome
- Richieri–Costa–Silveira–Pereira syndrome
- Richter syndrome
- Rickets
- Rickettsial disease
- Rickettsialpox
- Rickettsiosis
- Rieger syndrome
- Rift Valley fever
- Right atrium familial dilatation
- Right ventricle hypoplasia
- Rigid mask like face deafness polydactyly
- Rigid spine syndrome

=== Ril–Riv ===
- Riley–Day syndrome
- Ringed hair disease
- Ringworm
- Rivera–Perez–Salas syndrome

== Ro ==
- Roberts syndrome
- Robin sequence and oligodactyly
- Robinow–Sorauf syndrome
- Robinow syndrome
- Robinson–Miller–Bensimon syndrome
- Roch–Leri mesosomatous lipomatosis
- Rocky Mountain spotted fever
- Rod monochromacy
- Rod myopathy
- Rodini–Richieri–Costa syndrome
- Rokitansky–Kuster–Hauser syndrome
- Rokitansky sequence
- Romano–Ward syndrome
- Romberg hemi-facial atrophy
- Rombo syndrome
- Rommen–Mueller–Sybert syndrome
- Rosacea
- Rosai–Dorfman disease
- Rosenberg–Chutorian syndrome
- Rosenberg–Lohr syndrome
- Roseola infantum
- Rothmund–Thomson syndrome
- Rotor syndrome
- Roussy–Levy hereditary areflexic dystasia
- Rowley–Rosenberg syndrome
- Roy–Maroteaux–Kremp syndrome
- Rozin–Hertz–Goodman syndrome

== Ru ==
- Rubella virus antenatal infection
- Rubella, congenital
- Rubella
- Rubeola
- Rubinstein–Taybi like syndrome
- Rubinstein–Taybi syndrome (gene promoter involvement)
- Rudd Klimek syndrome
- Rudiger syndrome
- Rumination syndrome
- Rupophobia
- Rutledge–Friedman Harrod syndrome
- Ruvalcaba–Churesigaew–Myhre syndrome
- Ruvalcaba syndrome
- Ruvalcaba–Myhre syndrome
- Ruvalcaba–Myhre–Smith syndrome (BRR)
- Ruzicka Goerz Anton syndrome
