= List of diseases (U) =

This is a list of diseases starting with the letter "U".

== Ud–Up ==
- UDP-galactose-4-epimerase deficiency
- Uhl anomaly
- Ulbright–Hodes syndrome
- Ulcerative colitis
- Ulerythema ophryogenesis
- Ulna and fibula absence with severe limb deficit
- Ulna hypoplasia mental retardation
- Ulna metaphyseal dysplasia syndrome
- Ulnar hypoplasia lobster claw deformity of feet
- Umbilical cord ulceration intestinal atresia
- Uncombable hair syndrome
- Uniparental disomy of 11
- Uniparental disomy of 13
- Uniparental disomy of 14
- Uniparental disomy of 2
- Uniparental disomy of 6
- Uniparental disomy
- Unna–Politzer nevus
- Unna's seborrhoeic eczema
- Unverricht–Lundborg disease
- Upington disease
- Upper limb defect eye and ear abnormalities
- Upton–Young syndrome

== Ur ==
- Urachal cancer
- Urachal cyst
- Urbach–Wiethe disease
- Urban–Rogers–Meyer syndrome
- Urban–Schosser–Spohn syndrome
- Urea cycle enzymopathies
- Uremia
- Urethral obstruction sequence
- Uridine monophosphate synthetase deficiency
- Urinary calculi
- Urinary tract neoplasm
- Urioste–Martinez–Frias syndrome
- Urocanase deficiency
- Urogenital adysplasia
- Urophathy distal obstructive polydactyly
- Urticaria pigmentosa
- Urticaria
- Urticaria-deafness-amyloidosis

== Us–Uv ==
- Usher syndrome, type 1C
- Usher syndrome, type 1D
- Usher syndrome, type 1E
- Usher syndrome, type 2A
- Usher syndrome, type 2B
- Usher syndrome, type 2C
- Usher syndrome, type 3
- Usher syndrome, type IA
- Usher syndrome, type IB
- Usher syndrome
- Uveal diseases
- Uveitis, anterior
- Uveitis, posterior
- Uveitis
