= Syndactyly-nystagmus syndrome due to 2q31.1 microduplication =

Syndactyly-nystagmus syndrome due to 2q31.1 duplication
- Other names: 2q31.1 microduplication syndrome
- The microduplication associated with this condition is autosomal dominant
- Specialty: Medical genetics
- Symptoms: Mainly syndactyly and congenital bilateral pendular nystagmus
- Complications: None
- Usual onset: Birth
- Duration: Lifelong (unless surgically corrected)
- Causes: genetic mutation (more specifically an autosomal dominant chromosomal microduplication containing HOX genes)
- Prevention: None
- Prognosis: Good
- Frequency: Rare
- Deaths: -

Syndactyly-nystagmus syndrome due to 2q31.1 microduplication, also known as 2q31.1 microduplication syndrome, is a rare genetic disorder characterized by syndactyly affecting the third-fourth fingers and bilateral congenital nystagmus.

== Signs and symptoms ==
The following list comprises most of the symptoms shown by individuals with this condition:

- Short stature
- Congenital bilateral pendular nystagmus
- Shortening of the radius
- Shortening of the ulna
- Shortening of the tibia
- Shortening of the fibula
- Congenital syndactyly of the fourth to fifth fingers of the hand.

Less common symptoms include:

- Congenital clubfoot
- Complex hand anomalies
- Hypoplastic, triphalangeal thumbs

== Complications ==
There are usually no complications associated with this condition, although the limb shortening and hand anomalies might cause other psychological complications such as social insecurity.

== Genetics ==
This condition is caused by a 1 to 3.8 mb duplication of genetic material on the long arm of chromosome 2, more specifically, a location known as 2q31.1

== Diagnosis ==
For one to be diagnosed with this condition, they have to be physically examined and genetically tested.

== Epidemiology ==
Only 6 cases from 2 families in Korea and France have been described in medical literature.

== See also ==
- Duplication (genetics)
