= Dauwerse–Peters syndrome =

- Other names: Short stature, facial dysmorphism, severe brachydactyly and syndactyly
- Specialty: Medical genetics
- Causes: Translocation of 4q12 and 6p23.
- Prevention: none
- Prognosis: Ok
- Frequency: extraordinarily rare, only 1 case has been reported in medical literature
- Deaths: -

Dauwerse–Peters syndrome, also known as Short stature, facial dysmorphism, severe brachydactyly and syndactyly, is an extraordinarily rare novel genetic disorder which is characterized by a short height, depressed nasal bridge, flat facies, upward-slanting eyes, mild nostril anteversion, low-set ears, broad nasal root, severe generalized hand brachydactyly and 2nd-3rd toe syndactyly. Additional features include infertility due to azoospermia, radial and ulnar dysplasia, and pedal symphalangism. This disorder is extremely rare, since only 1 case has been reported in medical literature. This condition is caused by a chromosomal translocation.

== Etiology ==
This condition was discovered in July 2007 by Dawuerse et al., when they described a 35-year-old man of ethnic Indonesian descent. He had all of the symptoms mentioned above. Something that is worth noting is that his parents were healthy and not consanguineous and his five siblings were also healthy. When chromosomal analysis was done on him, a de novo chromosomal translocation was discovered; this translocation involved the q12 region of chromosome 4 (4q12) and the p23 region of chromosome 6 (6p23). Translocations involve the mutual change of two chromosomal segments into a new place in the human genome: one of the segments locate themselves into the place the other segment used to be in and vice versa (in this case, the 4p12 segment is in the place 6p23 used to be in before translocating and vice versa).
