= Radio-renal syndrome =

- Other names: Radio renal syndrome
- Specialty: Medical genetics

Radio-renal syndrome is a rare, presumably autosomal dominant genetic disorder characterized by underdevelopment of the digits as a result of the maldevelopment of either the radius, ulnae, or both, alongside renal ectopia, renal agenesis, mild malformations of the external ear, short stature. An increased frequency of lymphocyte chromosomal breaks has been reported. Only 4 cases have been described in the medical literature.

It was described for the first time in the year 1980 by Siegler et al.
