= HMD =

HMD may refer to:

== Biology, medicine, chemistry ==
- 5,10-Methenyltetrahydromethanopterin hydrogenase, an enzyme found in methanogenic archea
- Heavy metal detoxification, the removal of metallic toxic substances from the body
- Hexamethylenediamine, an organic compound

=== Pathology ===
- Hepatic microvascular dysplasia, a disorder where mixing of venous blood and arterial blood in the liver occurs at the microscopic level
- Hereditary mucoepithelial dysplasia, a rare autosomal dominant multiepithelial disorder
- Hoof and mouth disease, an infectious viral disease that affects cloven-hoofed animals
- Hyaline membrane disease, now called infant respiratory distress syndrome
- Human Mortality Database, a joint initiative of the University of California, Berkeley, US and the MPI for Demographic Research in Rostock, Germany

== Places ==
- Heard Island and McDonald Islands (ISO 3166 region code HMD), Antarctic islands of Australia

=== Railway stations ===
- Hammond station (Louisiana) (station code HMD), a train station in Louisiana, US
- Hampden Park railway station (station code HMD), a railway station in Sussex, England, UK

== Groups, companies, organizations ==
- HMD Global, a Finnish mobile phone manufacturer spun out from Nokia Corporation
- HMD Motorsports, an American racing team
- Hazira Manufacturing Division, Surat, Hazira, Gujarat, India; a manufactory of Reliance Industries Limited
- Hospital for Mental Diseases, Shahdara, Delhi, India; predecessor to Institute of Human Behaviour and Allied Sciences
- HD Hyundai Mipo, a South Korea shipbuilding company
- Hyundai Motor Distributors, predecessor to Hyundai Automotive South Africa
- Charlie Hammonds Flying Service (ICAO airline code HMD), a U.S. airline; see List of airline codes (C)

== Linguistics ==
- Ḥ-M-D, a root of many Arabic and some Hebrew words
- A-Hmao language (ISO 639 language code hmd), spoken in China

== Other uses ==
- Head-mounted display, a display device, worn on the head or as part of a helmet
  - Helmet-mounted display, for aviation applications

== See also ==
- Havo voor Muziek en Dans, a secondary school in Rotterdam, Netherlands
- Her Majesty's Dockyard
