= Juberg =

Juberg may refer to:

- Juberg–Hayward syndrome
- Ludde Juberg (1884–1968), Swedish actor
