= Juberg–Hayward syndrome =

- Other names: Cleft lip/palate with abnormal thumbs and microcephaly
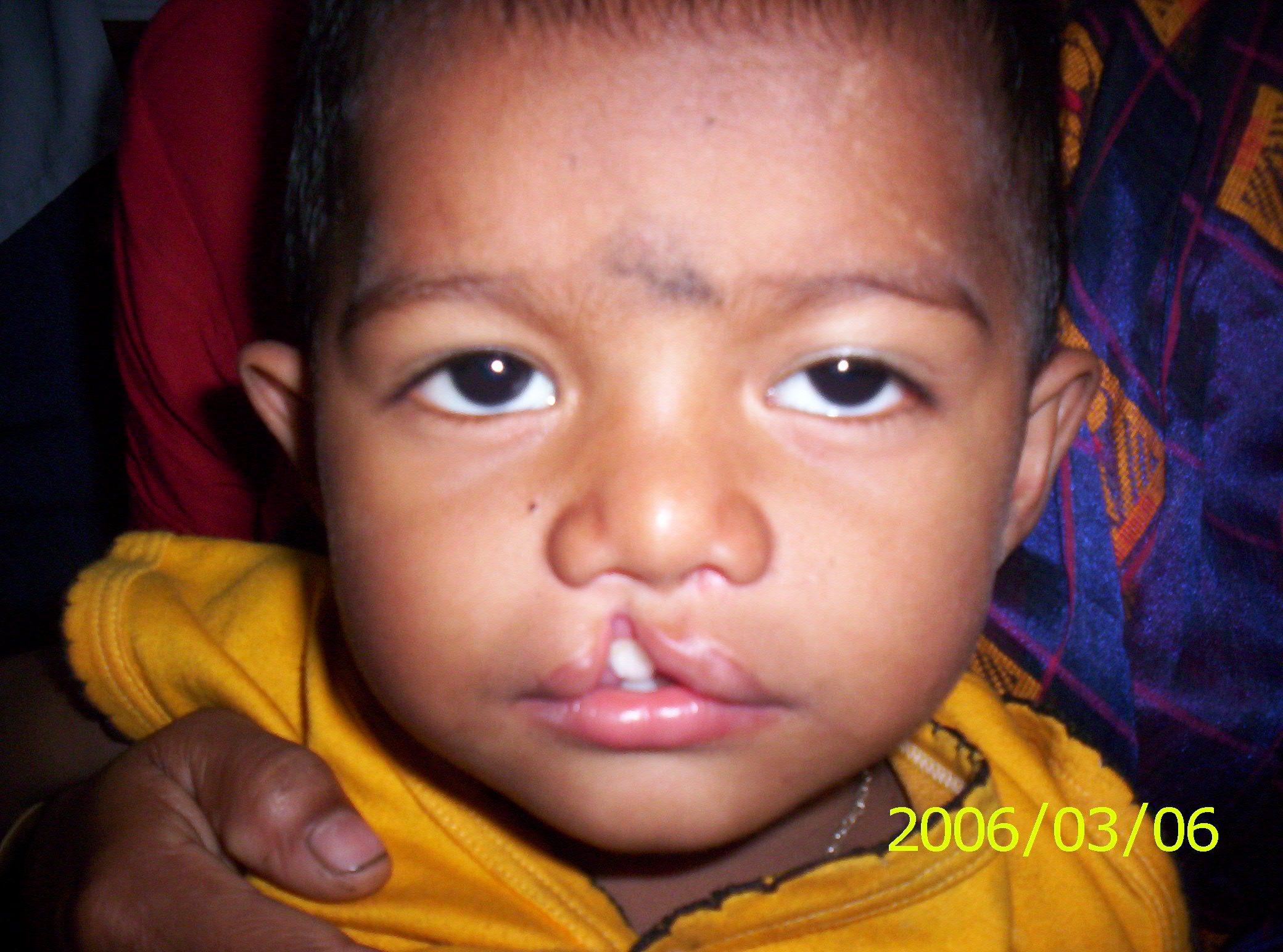

Juberg–Hayward syndrome is a rare genetic syndrome characterised by cleft lip and cleft palate, microcephaly, ptosis, short stature, hypoplasia or aplasia of thumbs, dislocation of radial head and fusion of humerus and radius. The abnormalities in the arm lead to restriction of movement in the elbow.

== Presentation ==
These include

- Growth retardation
- Microcephaly
- Cleft lip and palate
- Minor vertebral and rib anomalies
- Horseshoe kidneys
- Thumb anomalies
- Triphalangeal thumb
- Radial ray anomalies

== Genetics ==
This syndrome is caused by mutations in the establishment of cohesion 1 homolog 2 (ESCO2) gene. This gene is located on the short arm of chromosome 8 (8p21.1). Mutations in this gene also cause Roberts syndrome.

Juberg–Hayward syndrome is inherited in an autosomal recessive pattern.

== History ==
This condition was first described in 1969 by Juberg and Hayward.
