= Say-Field-Coldwell syndrome =

- Other names: Triphalangeal thumb-patella subluxation
- Specialty: Medical genetics
- Symptoms: Minor physical anomalies, regular dislocation of the patella and short stature
- Complications: usually, none
- Usual onset: infancy
- Duration: life-long
- Causes: Genetic mutation
- Diagnostic method: Physical evaluation
- Prevention: none
- Prognosis: good
- Frequency: very rare, only 4 cases have been recorded in medical literature.

Say-Field-Coldwell syndrome is a very rare genetic disorder which consists of triphalangeal thumbs, brachydactyly, camptodactyly, regular dislocation of the patella and short stature. Only one affected woman and her (also affected) three daughters have been described in medical literature.
