= Schmitt Gillenwater Kelly syndrome =

- Other names: Radial hypoplasia-triphalangeal thumbs-hypospadias-maxillary diastema syndrome
- Schmitt Gillenwater Kelly syndrome has an autosomal dominant pattern of inheritance.

Schmitt Gillenwater Kelly syndrome is a rare autosomal dominant congenital disorder consisting of radial hypoplasia, triphalangeal thumbs, hypospadias, and maxillary diastema.

== Discovery ==
It was first identified by Edward Schmitt, Jay Y. Gillenwater, Thadeus E. Kelly, and John M. Opitz in 1962, where they published their results in a case study. The family was found to be minimally restricted in normal functions, and lived relatively normal lives. The symptoms were consistent throughout all the members of the family, with the exception of all three of the boys having hypospadias.

== Radial hypoplasia ==
=== Signs and symptoms ===
The family had hypoplastic radii, which resulted in approximately 50% shorter radii. Because of this, the ulna was bowed outwards with outermost part of the ulna being pushed towards the skin. This resulted in a shorter reach.

=== Causes ===
Although more research is needed, the genetic cause of radial hypoplasia is believed to come from a rare allele of the Sonic hedgehog (Shh) gene. This gene produces the Shh protein that induces development of the ulna, and the index, middle, ring, and pinky fingers while increasing the expression of fibroblast growth factor (FGF), another signaling molecule, which induces development of the radius and thumb. Both Shh and FGF are widely expressed during early embryo development. When this rare allele of Shh gene is expressed, the result is reduced Shh protein production, which hampers FGF expression, potentially leading to radial hypoplasia.

=== Treatment and prognosis ===
Treatment usually begins after birth and minor cases involve stretching, manipulation, and splinting. The goal of surgery is to increase length and straighten forearm and thumb reconstruction.

== Triphalangeal thumbs ==
=== Signs and symptoms ===
Triphalangeal thumbs

Another symptom of the individuals with the syndrome was Bilaterally symmetrical triphalangeal thumbs had three phalanges rather than two, and a longer finger like appearance. The thumbs were non-opposable.

=== Causes ===
The cause of this condition is understood to be genetic in nature, but the exact mechanism is unknown. However, research has shown that the gene of interest is located in chromosome 7, with potential candidate genes including EN2 and the human homologs of mouse genes Hx and Hm.

=== Treatment and prognosis ===
Surgery is done to correct any variations in the thumb and improve appearance; methods would vary on a case-by-case basis

== Hypospadia ==
=== Signs and symptoms ===
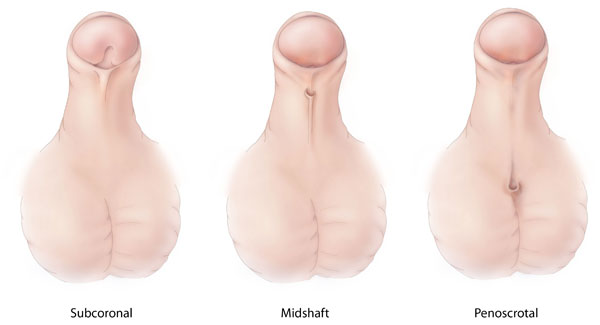
Examples of different types of hypospadias

In the males, Hypospadias was seen, which is the opening of the urethra was at the underside of the penis rather than at the tip.

=== Causes ===
Hypospadias can come about as a result of imbalances in the Wnt, Shh, Hox, and BMP pathways during fetal development. The Wnt, Shh, Hox, and BMP families are widely expressed throughout development. During the development of male external genitalia, Shh acts as a central cue, indirectly activating Hoxa13 and Hoxd13 by binding to the Patched receptor, and directly activating BMP2, Fgf10, Wnt5a, and BMP4. Fgf10 induces further Shh expression, while BMP4 represses Wnt5a expression. Rare allelic expression of any one of these genes can result in hypospadias.

=== Treatment and prognosis ===
Minor forms do not require reconstructive surgery; Interventions include: correcting the location of urethral opening, repairing skin near the urethra opening, and straightening penile shaft.

== Maxillary diastema ==
=== Signs and symptoms ===
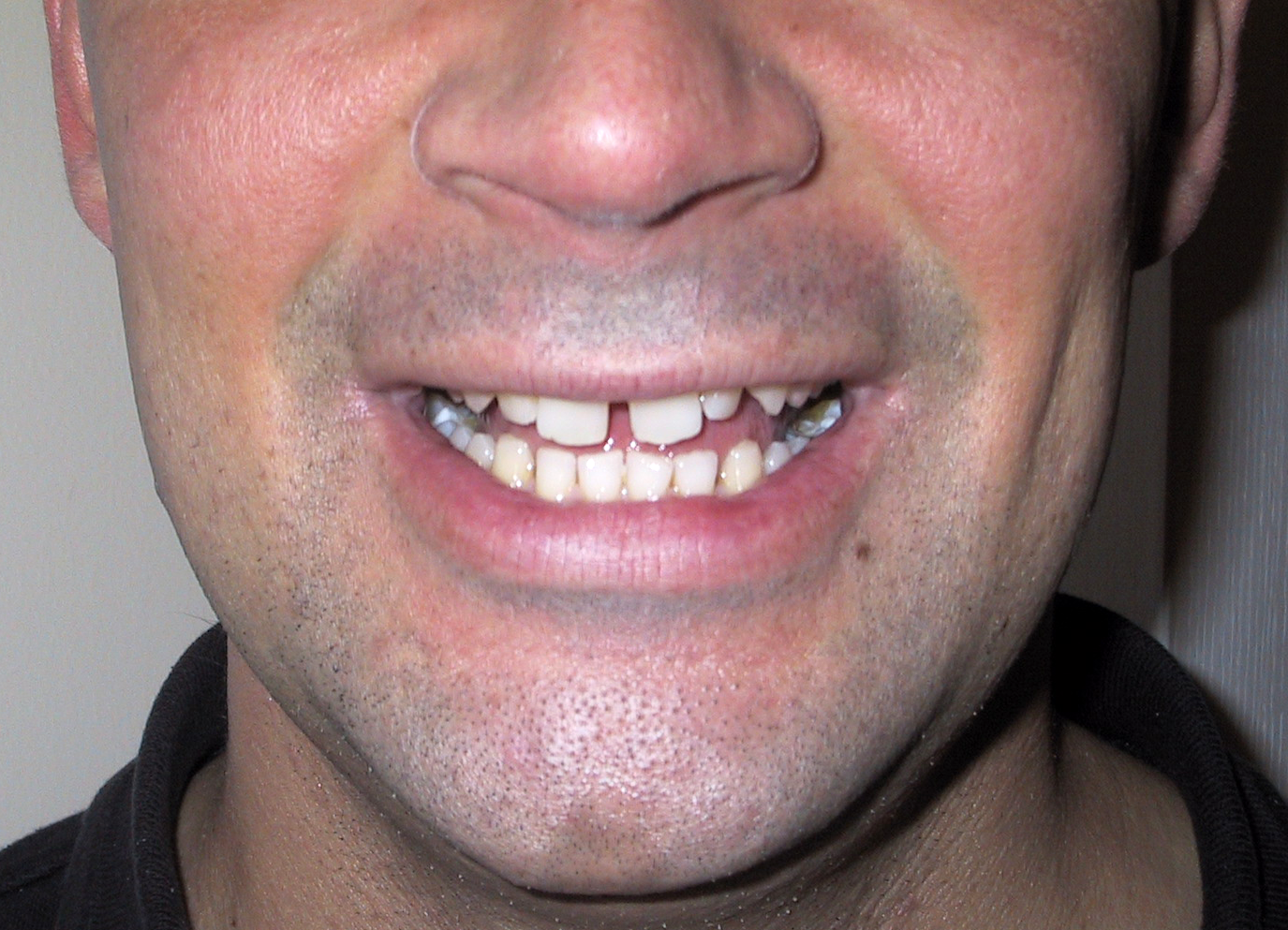
Diastema of the upper (maxillary) teeth

The family also had Anterior Maxillary Diastema, a space between the upper incisors.

=== Causes ===
It highly likely this condition is caused by a genetic factor, but the exact gene is unknown.

=== Treatment and prognosis ===
Treatment is centered around closing the gap between the incisors: either by veneers, braces, implants, or boding to conceal the gap.

== Similar diseases ==
Marfan syndrome - Is another autosomal dominant congenital condition. Symptoms consist of curved spine, thumb abnormalities, heart disease. Like Schmitt Gillenwater Kelly syndrome, surgery is done for cosmetic and reconstructive purposes. Unlike Schmitt GIllenwater Kelly Syndrome, Marfan syndrome has a higher likelihood of developing life-threatening complications.
