= Renal–hepatic–pancreatic dysplasia =

Genetic disorder of the kidney, liver, and pancreas

- Other names: Ivemark II syndrome, Renohepaticopancreatic dysplasia
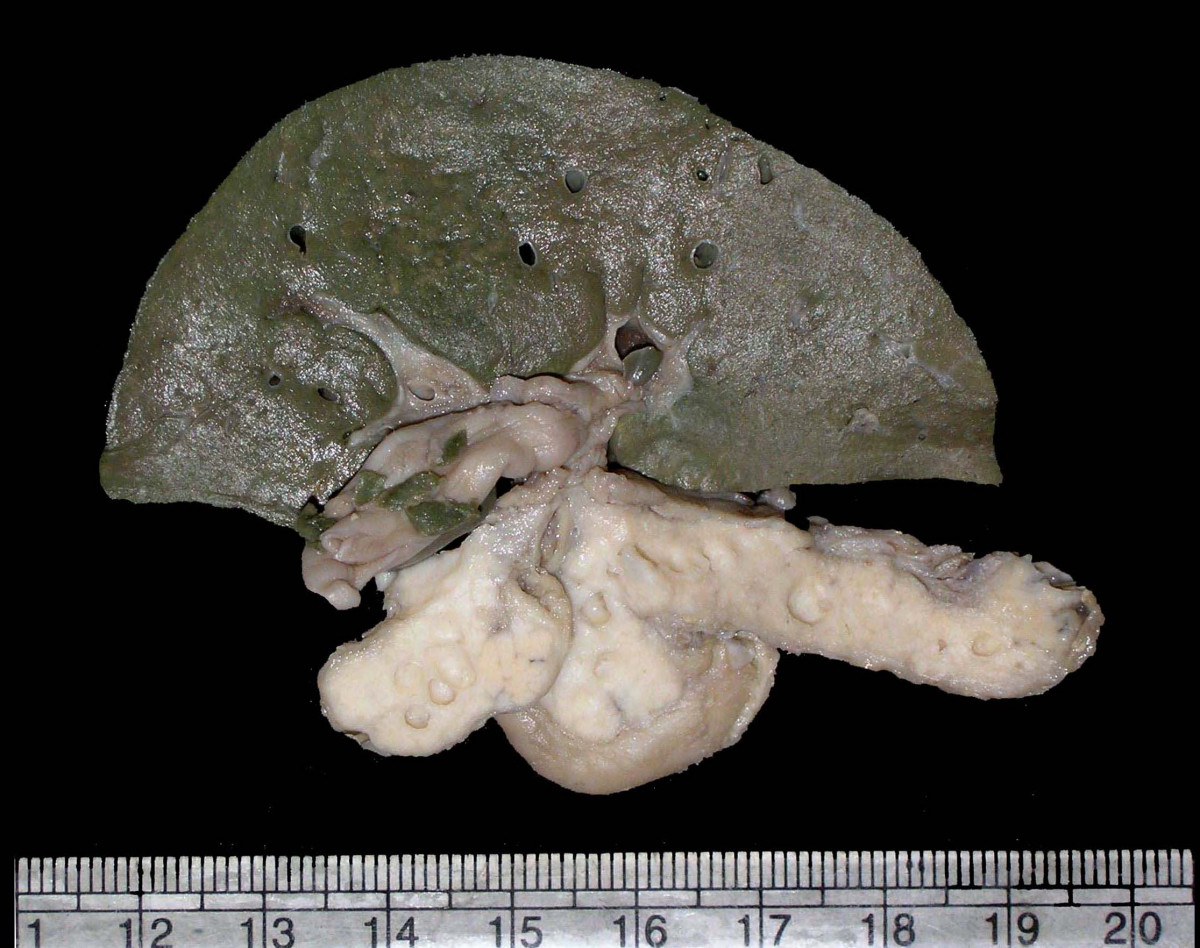
- Photo of liver and pancreas showing multiple cysts in the latter in a patient with renal–hepatic–pancreatic dysplasia

Renal–hepatic–pancreatic dysplasia is an autosomal recessive congenital disorder characterized by pancreatic fibrosis, renal dysplasia and hepatic dysgenesis. An association with NPHP3 has been described. It was characterized in 1959.

== Presentation ==
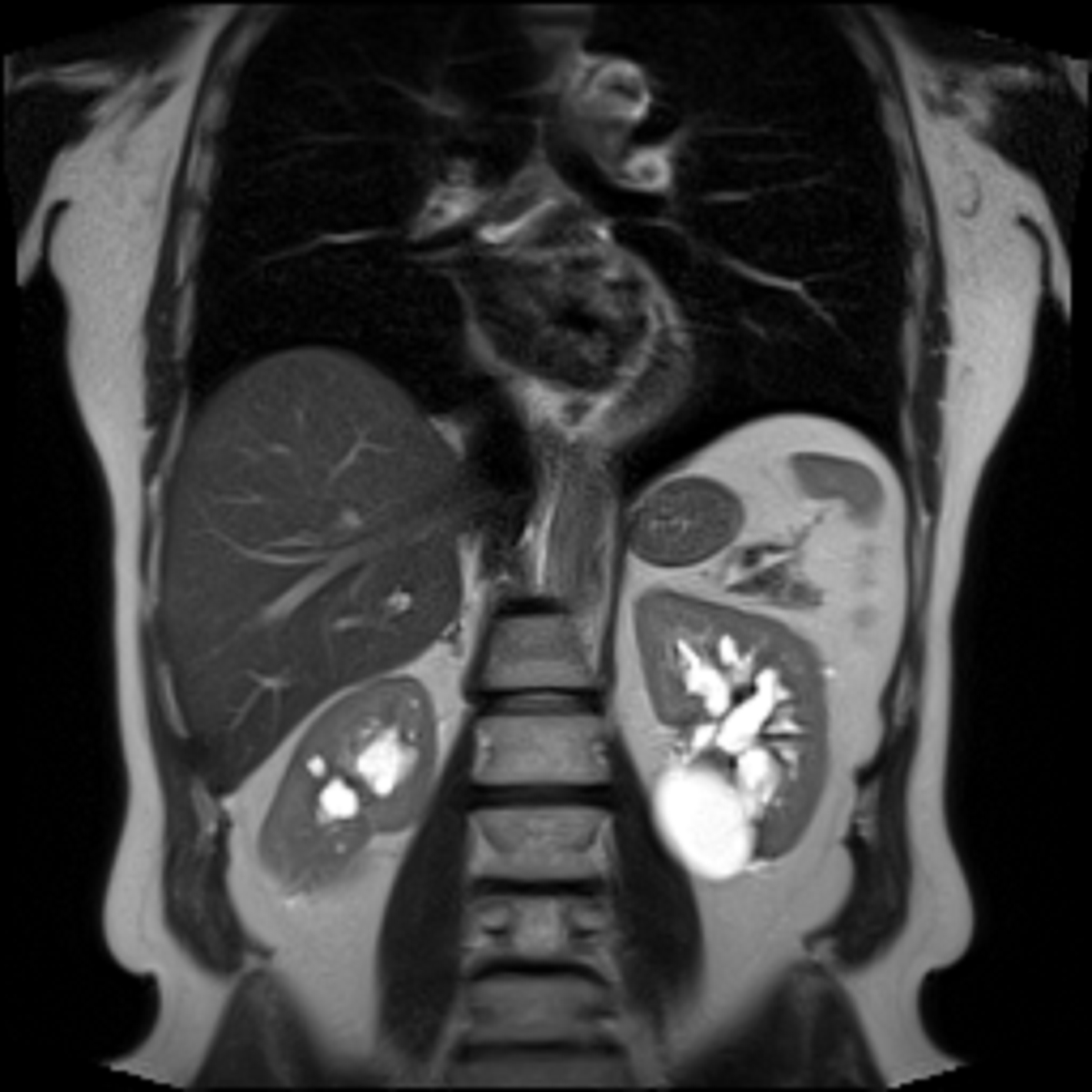
Renal cyst MRI (Contributed by Ptrump16 https://commons.wikimedia.org/wiki/File:Renal_cyst_MRI.jpg)

Renal–hepatic–pancreatic dysplasia (RHPD) is characterized by unusual kidney cell development, disrupted liver development, and hardening or thickening scar tissue in the pancreas.

Through observation of fetuses that had died, it was determined that this syndrome has key representative external and microscopic appearances that can help diagnose the condition. The kidneys in many cases, appear to be enlarged, with cysts distributed throughout the tissue. Molecularly, many basic nephron structures, the part of the kidney that produces urine, are not identifiable or present. The appearance of the liver is often firm, with many cysts throughout. Microscopically, irregular bile duct development is detected, further restricted by thick scar tissue. The pancreas typically consisted of disorganized tissue and ducts that were dilated and not thoroughly developed. It was occasionally covered in cysts, with thick scar tissue throughout the organ.

Although these observable features remain moderately consistent throughout various cases, other symptoms are case-specific, which has concluded that this syndrome does not have a homogenous display. Additionally, the disruption to liver development may be progressive since it does not arise in line with the kidney and pancreatic disturbances.

== Genetics ==
=== NPHP 3 Function and Role ===
Changes in genes associated with Nephronophthisis (NPHP — a common genetic disorder that causes kidney diseases in younger populations) have been identified as the probable genetic cause for renal failure in the first 3 decades of life and can develop as renal cysts. 10 genes were found to be responsible for NPHP: NPHP1-6, Glis2/NPHP7, RPGRIPL1/NPHP8, NEK8/NPHP9, and MKS3/NPHP11. Mutations in NPHP3 are heavily involved with RHPD.

A chromosome with 1 rare variant copy (heterozygous NPHP3/nphp3) leads to reduced expression and is a known cause of cystic kidney disease. This differs from a chromosome where both copies are rare variants. 2 variant copies of NPHP3 in humans will result in situs inversus (organs develop in flipped mirror image), polydactyly (born with extra fingers), central nervous system malformations, structural heart defects, preauricular fistulas (external ear disease), and a wide range of physical variation of the kidney and urinary tract structures.

=== Role of NEK8 ===
The role of protein kinases is to move a phosphate group from a high-energy molecule (adenosine triphosphate - ATP) to other molecules. These play a crucial role in the regulation of many biological processes NIMA Related Kinases (NEK) are involved in the regulation of cilia (small hair-like structures on the surface of cells) and pathways that initiate on the cell surface – especially the Hippo pathway which is involved in organ development. Mutations or alterations of NEK8 sequence can result in major organ development issues through alterations of the Hippo pathway.

Different alterations to the NEK8 gene sequence can have varying impacts on organ development and formation of cilia. If the alteration causes NEK8 to be non-functional, it can result in kidneys and pancreas becoming enlarged and developing cysts. Alterations in NEK8 that slightly change its genetic sequence can cause asymmetric growth of kidney cells (dysplasia) and the dilation of tubes necessary for returning vital substances back to blood after the filtering process and removing waste in kidneys.

== Prognosis ==
The research identifies 17 cases of reported RHPD, of which 4 of 17 surpassed age one, and 2 received organ transplantation. The 4 patients that survived past age one required kidney dialysis treatments, suffered from malnutrition and had a range of heart problems, including heart enlargement and heart vessel narrowing. Those who did not receive organ transplantation progressed into late-stage kidney failure combined with heart and liver complications that eventually led to death, leaving their quality of life to be very poor.

Currently, there are no treatments for RHPD that relieve all its symptoms collectively. However, there are treatments for many of the symptoms separately that can reduce the disease load on the patient. To treat kidney disease, renal dialysis can be utilized. The treatment for heart vessel narrowing is an aortic valve replacement. Currently, there is no approved treatment for the thickening of pancreatic scar tissue, however, you can reduce ongoing damage by avoiding the consumption of alcohol and reducing fat food intake.
