= Hyundai Automotive South Africa =

Automobile manufacturer

- Company type: Subsidiary
- Industry: Automotive
- Founded: 1999
- Headquarters: Bedfordview, South Africa
- Key people: Stanley Anderson (President and CEO)
- Parent: Hyundai Motor Company
- Website: www.hyundai.co.za

Hyundai Automotive South Africa (Pty) Ltd. is a dealer network and automobile manufacturer based in Bedfordview, South Africa and a subsidiary of Hyundai.

== History ==
The company was formed in 1999 as a collaboration between the holding company Associated Motor Holdings and Hyundai. It succeeded the dealer network Hyundai Motor Distributors (HMD).

The HMD network founded by Billy Rautenbach, with 52 branches, was able to offer vehicles that were inexpensively assembled by the Motor Company of Botswana and an extended warranty of three years. With these and other aggressive methods, it had achieved a ten percent market share in South Africa.

Hyundai has been assembling trucks in Gauteng since July 2014. In March 2015, the assembly of the H100 was added.
