= Femur fibula ulna syndrome =

Femur-fibula-ulna syndrome
- Other names: Femur-fibula-ulna complex
- Specialty: Orthopedic

Femur-fibula-ulna syndrome (FFU syndrome) is a very rare syndrome characterized by abnormalities of the femur (thigh bone), fibula (calf bone) and the ulna (forearm bone). There have been suggestions that FFU complex may be the same as proximal femoral focal deficiency (PFFD) although authors are currently in disagreement over whether or not the disorders are in fact separate. The breadth of the abnormality and number of limbs involved is considered sporadic although upper limbs are more affected than lower limbs and right side malformation is more prevalent than the left. The condition was first noted by Lenz and Feldman in 1977.

== See also ==
- Proximal femoral focal deficiency
- Van De Berghe Dequeker syndrome
