= Ulna hypoplasia-intellectual disability syndrome =

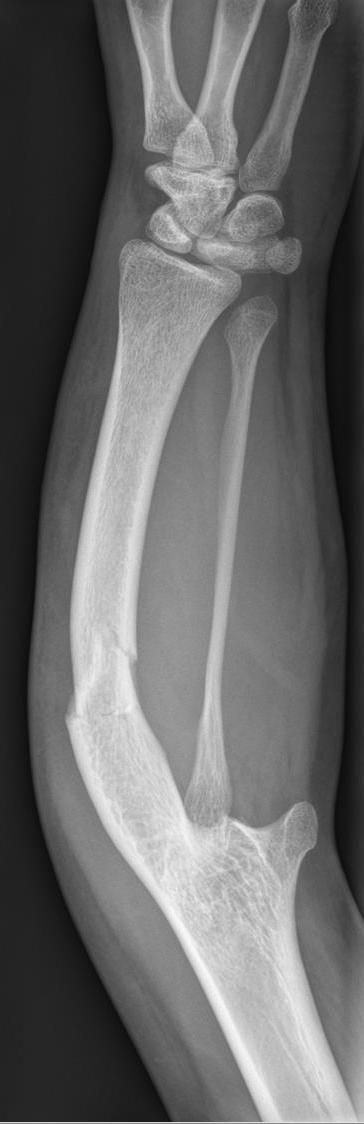
- Specialty: Medical genetics
- Prevention: none
- Prognosis: Poor
- Frequency: very rare, only 2 cases have been described in medical literature
- Deaths: 2

Ulna hypoplasia-intellectual disability syndrome is a very rare genetic disorder which is characterized by shortening of the arms associated with ulnar aplasia/hypoplasia, bilateral clubbed feet, widespread nail aplasia/hypoplasia, and severe psychomotor delays with intellectual disabilities. It has only been described in two siblings born to consanguineous Arab parents. It is thought to be inherited in an autosomal recessive manner.
