= ESCO2 =

Protein-coding gene in the species Homo sapiens

Identifiers
- Aliases: ESCO2, 2410004I17Rik, EFO2, RBS, establishment of sister chromatid cohesion N-acetyltransferase 2, EFO2p, hEFO2, JHS
- External IDs: OMIM: 609353; MGI: 1919238; GeneCards: ESCO2

Gene location (Human)
Chr.	Chromosome 8 (human)
Band	8p21.1	Start	27,771,949 bp
Band	8p21.1	End	27,812,640 bp

Gene location (Mouse)
Chr.	Chromosome 14 (mouse)
Band	14|14 D1	Start	66,056,487 bp
Band	14|14 D1	End	66,071,443 bp
RNA expression pattern
Bgee	Human / Mouse (ortholog); Top expressed in: oocyte; buccal mucosa cell; secondary oocyte; gonad; testicle; ventricular zone; ganglionic eminence; bone marrow cell; stromal cell of endometrium; rectum / Top expressed in: zygote; hand; spermatogonium; secondary oocyte; morula; primary oocyte; blastocyst; tail of embryo; genital tubercle; Gonadal ridge; More reference expression data
BioGPS	n/a
Gene ontology
Molecular function	transferase activity; acyltransferase activity; metal ion binding; lysine N-acetyltransferase activity, acting on acetyl phosphate as donor; N-acetyltransferase activity; acetyltransferase activity
Cellular component	site of double-strand break; XY body; chromocenter; chromatin; Golgi apparatus; nucleus; nucleoplasm; cell junction; chromosome
Biological process	chromosome segregation; post-translational protein acetylation; cell cycle; protein localization to chromatin; double-strand break repair; hematopoietic progenitor cell differentiation; regulation of DNA replication; sister chromatid cohesion
Sources:Amigo / QuickGO
Orthologs
Databases	NCBI: entry; OMA: entry
Species	Human	Mouse
Entrez	157570	71988
Ensembl	ENSG00000171320	ENSMUSG00000022034
UniProt	Q56NI9	Q8CIB9
RefSeq (mRNA)	NM_001017420	NM_028039
RefSeq (protein)	NP_001017420	NP_082315
Location (UCSC)	Chr 8: 27.77 – 27.81 Mb	Chr 14: 66.06 – 66.07 Mb
PubMed search
- Wikidata
View/Edit Human	View/Edit Mouse

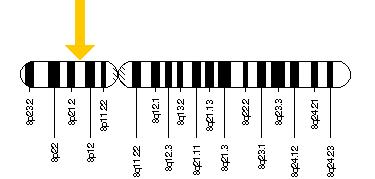
The ESCO2 gene is located on the short (p) arm of chromosome 8 at position 21.1.

N-acetyltransferase ESCO2, also known as establishment of cohesion 1 homolog 2 or ECO1 homolog 2, is an enzyme that in humans is encoded by the ESCO2 gene.

== Function ==
This gene encodes a protein that may have acetyltransferase activity and may be required for the establishment of sister chromatid cohesion during the S phase of the cell cycle.

== Clinical significance ==
Mutations in the ESCO2 gene are associated with Roberts syndrome and Juberg-Hayward Syndrome.

== See also ==
- Cohesin#Clinical significance
- Establishment of sister chromatid cohesion
