= Renal dysplasia-limb defects syndrome =

- Other names: Ulbright–Hodes syndrome
- Purine nucleoside phosphorylase deficiency has an autosomal recessive pattern of inheritance.

Renal dysplasia-limb defects syndrome (RL syndrome), also known as Ulbright–Hodes syndrome, is a very rare autosomal recessive congenital disorder. It has been described in three infants, all of whom died shortly after birth.

== Presentation ==
RL syndrome is characterized by renal dysplasia, growth retardation, phocomelia or mesomelia, radiohumeral fusion (joining of radius and humerus), rib abnormalities, anomalies of the external genitalia and potter-like facies among many others.

== Genetics ==
RL syndrome is inherited in an autosomal recessive manner. This means the defective gene responsible for the disorder is located on an autosome, and two copies of the defective gene (one inherited from each parent) are required in order to be born with the disorder. The parents of an individual with an autosomal recessive disorder both carry one copy of the defective gene, but usually do not experience any signs or symptoms of the disorder.
