= GREB1L =

Protein-coding gene in humans

Identifiers
- Aliases: GREB1L, C18orf6, KIAA1772, growth regulation by estrogen in breast cancer-like, growth regulation by estrogen in breast cancer 1 like, RHDA3, GREB1 like retinoic acid receptor coactivator, DFNA80
- External IDs: OMIM: 617782; MGI: 3576497; HomoloGene: 73393; GeneCards: GREB1L; OMA:GREB1L - orthologs

Gene location (Human)
| Chr. | Chromosome 18 (human) |
| Band | 18q11.1-q11.2 | Start | 21,242,232 bp |
| Band | 18q11.1-q11.2 | End | 21,526,112 bp |

Gene location (Mouse)
| Chr. | Chromosome 18 (mouse) |
| Band | 18|18 A1 | Start | 10,325,177 bp |
| Band | 18|18 A1 | End | 10,562,940 bp |
RNA expression pattern
| Bgee | Human / Mouse (ortholog); Top expressed in: buccal mucosa cell; testicle; gastrocnemius muscle; muscle of thigh; decidua; right auricle of heart; secondary oocyte; apex of heart; left lobe of thyroid gland; gonad / Top expressed in: primitive streak; tail of embryo; cumulus cell; otic vesicle; ovary; genital tubercle; substantia nigra; hand; Gonadal ridge; trigeminal ganglion; More reference expression data |
| BioGPS | n/a |
Orthologs
| Species | Human | Mouse |
| Entrez | 80000 | 381157 |
| Ensembl | ENSG00000141449 | ENSMUSG00000042942 |
| UniProt | Q9C091 | B9EJV3 |
| RefSeq (mRNA) | NM_001142966; NM_024935 | NM_001083628 |
| RefSeq (protein) | NP_001136438 | NP_001077097 |
| Location (UCSC) | Chr 18: 21.24 – 21.53 Mb | Chr 18: 10.33 – 10.56 Mb |
| PubMed search |
- Wikidata
| View/Edit Human | View/Edit Mouse |

Growth regulation by estrogen in breast cancer-like is a protein that in humans is encoded by the GREB1L gene.
