= Chromosome 2q31.1 duplication syndrome gene =

Protein found in humans

DUP2Q31.1

Identifiers
- Aliases: C2DUPq31.1Chromosome 2q31.1 duplication syndrome
- External IDs: GeneCards: ; OMA:- orthologs
Orthologs
Species	Human	Mouse
Entrez	100529099	n/a
Ensembl	n/a	n/a
UniProt	n a	n/a
RefSeq (mRNA)	n/a	n/a
RefSeq (protein)	n/a	n/a
Location (UCSC)	n/a	n/a
PubMed search		n/a
- Wikidata
View/Edit Human

Chromosome 2q31.1 duplication syndrome is a protein that in humans is encoded by the DUP2Q31.1 gene.
