= Revesz syndrome =

- Other names: Dyskeratosis congenita with bilateral exudative retinopathy
- Revesz syndrome is inherited in an autosomal dominant manner
- Causes: Genetic

Revesz syndrome is a fatal disease that causes exudative retinopathy and bone marrow failure. Other symptoms include severe aplastic anemia, intrauterine growth retardation, fine sparse hair, fine reticulate skin pigmentation, ataxia due to cerebellar hypoplasia, and cerebral calcifications. Its effects are similar to that of Hoyeraal-Hreidarsson syndrome. It is a variant of dyskeratosis congenita.

== Cause ==
Revesz syndrome is a genetic disease thought to be caused by short telomeres. Patients with Revesz syndrome have presented with heterozygous mutations in TINF2 gene which is located on chromosome 14q12. There is no treatment for this disease yet.

== Epidemiology ==
Revesz syndrome has so far been observed only in children. There is not much information about the disease because of its low frequency in general population and under reporting of cases.

== History ==
The syndrome is named after the author of the original case published in 1992. The patient was a 6-month-old male from Sudan. At 7 months, the patient developed aplastic anemia, and subsequently died at 19 months. A second case was reported in 1994 in a young girl in Hungary. She had many of the same symptoms as the child in Sudan. A third case, reported in Calicut, India, was that of a 5-year-old girl who also had additional features of retinal detachment and retinitis pigmentosa, which are unreported in this syndrome.

== See also ==
- List of cutaneous conditions
