= Rudiger syndrome =

- Rudiger syndrome is inherited in an autosomal recessive manner

Rudiger syndrome is a congenital disorder characterized by the association of severe growth retardation with abnormalities of the extremities, urogenital abnormalities and facial abnormalities. It has been described in a family where an affected brother and sister died as infants. Both autosomal recessive and autosomal dominant inheritance have been suggested with the disorder.

The features ectrodactyly, ectodermal dysplasia and cleft palate have been described with Rudiger syndrome, giving it the rarely used designation "EEC syndrome". However, this is not to be confused with the formal EEC syndrome associated with chromosome 7.

It was characterized in 1971.
