= Van Den Berghe Dequeker syndrome =

- Other names: Severe ulnar aplasia and lobster claw feet, familial ulnar aplasia and lobster claw syndrome, complete absence of the ulna and of fingers 2 to 5, together with lobster-claw deformity of the feet
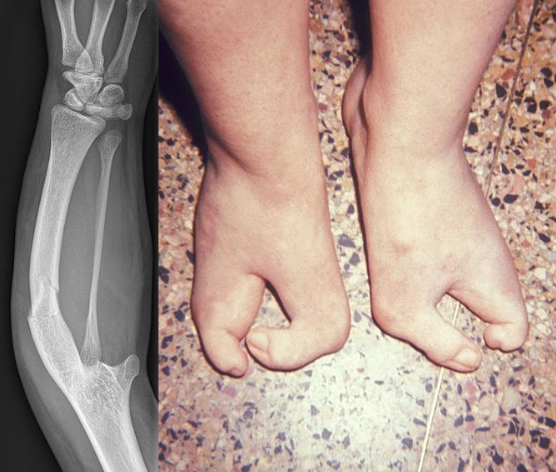
- Specialty: Medical genetics
- Symptoms: Ectrodactyly of the hand and ulnar aplasia, Split foot malformation
- Usual onset: Pre-natal
- Duration: Life-long
- Causes: Genetic mutation
- Risk factors: Having parents with the disorder
- Diagnostic method: Physical evaluation
- Prevention: None
- Treatment: Reconstructive surgery or prosthetics
- Prognosis: Good
- Frequency: Very rare (< 1 in 1 000 000)

Van Den Berghe Dequeker syndrome, also known as ulnar hypoplasia-split foot syndrome, is a very rare congenital limb malformation syndrome which is characterized by severe ulnar hypoplasia, absence of the index to little finger in both hands, and split-foot.

== Discovery ==
It was first discovered in 1978 by H van den Berghe et al., when they described four males (consisting of three brothers and one maternal nephew) of a two-generation family with a "lobster-claw foot" and an "ulnar defect". The lobster-claw architecture of the foot is described as the I and V toes being the only ones developed, resulting in the appearance of a split-foot. Morphology of the ulnar defect ranged from a shortened ulna to complete absence of the ulna with a curved, thickened radius. Van de Berghe et al. also noticed that some female members (the mother and maternal aunt of an affected male) showed minor hypoplasia and slight deformations of the toes, as well as shorter ulnas and marginally curved radii. At the time of discovery, ulnar aplasia occurred sporadically and infrequently, therefore, the documentation of this occurring familially was considered to be rare.

== Genetic basis ==
Minor severity of said ulnar defect and toe syndactyly in female members of the same family studied in the original discovery suggested that this disorder was transmitted in an X-linked recessive manner, although autosomal dominance with reduced penetrance wasn't excluded as an inheritance pattern. It is more common in males than females. It is hard to characterize the genetic basis of the symptoms of this syndrome, such as the split-foot deformity, due to the lack of occurrence, the wide array of genes involved in limb development, and the complicated interactions of these genes and gene products. While genes and chromosomal loci for other syndromes involving split-hand/split-foot deformities have been identified, specific loci for Van Den Berghe Dequeker syndrome have not been studied.

== Diagnosis and treatment ==
The symptoms (split foot and ulnar hypoplasia) of the syndrome can be observed from birth. During diagnosis, a doctor may try to rule out other possible diseases or refer the patient to a specialist. Genetic counseling can be done for individuals with the syndrome who are planning on having children. Treatment of the condition can include reconstructive surgery or the use of prosthetics to improve the ability to carry out daily tasks.

== Challenges ==
Individuals with Van Den Berghe Dequeker syndrome and their families can face many challenges. Since it is a rare disease, there may be scarce information on the syndrome and the treatments. Individuals with the syndrome may experience difficulties in carrying out daily activities and must adapt to them. They might also be affected in the social aspect including isolation. Families may face hardships with caregiving and finance that comes with the disease.

For those affected by the syndrome, it may be helpful to visit a patient advocacy and support organization, which can be easily accessed online. These organizations can be either umbrella organizations, focusing on a wide array of diseases, or disease-specific, focused on improving the lives of individuals with a particular condition. Patient advocacy and support organizations can provide help by connecting affected individuals and their families with other affected individuals, providing a means for individuals to share their stories in a safe environment.. Furthermore, organizations can also provide support in terms of financial aid and travel resources. Additionally, many organizations offer opportunities for patients and caregivers to speak with a health professional through the phone as well as enrol in educational support programs.

== Connections to other syndromes ==
Van Den Berghe Dequeker syndrome has been linked with additional anomalies affecting the musculoskeletal system, including; clubfoot, fibular deficiency, femoral deficiency and absence of the patella.

Ulnar defects present in Van Den Berghe Dequeker syndrome are also present in the Cornelia de Lange syndrome, and Weyers oligodactyly syndrome. Additionally, some of the symptoms in Van Den Berghe Dequeker overlap with symptoms that are present in syndromes such as femoral-fibular-ulnar deficiency syndrome, and ulnar-fibular dysplasia. The overlap between these conditions may make it difficult for a doctor to make a diagnosis.
