= Umbilical cord ulceration and intestinal atresia =

- Other names: Umbilical cord ulcer with intestinal atresia
- Specialty: Gastroenterology

Umbilical cord ulceration and intestinal atresia is a rare congenital disease that results in intestinal atresia, umbilical cord ulceration and severe intrauterine haemorrhage. Only 15 cases have been reported to date, although recent studies suggest that the incidence rate of this disease may be higher than previously thought. A specific study established a clear link between intestinal atresia and umbilical cord ulceration after reporting five such cases at the time of publication.
