= Motor Company of Botswana =

Motor Company

The Motor Company of Botswana (Pty.) Ltd. was joint venture of the Hyundai Motor Company with its local dealership Hyundai Motor Distributors (Pty.). The company was founded in 1992 with its headquarters in Gaborone, Botswana. In February 1993 they began the assembly of Hyundai CKD kits until closing in 2001.

The company was co-founded by Billy Rautenbach, a wealthy businessman from Zimbabwe that also owned Wheels of Africa, a large cargo trucking enterprise. Hyundai, however, only delivered the CKD kits, from which Hyundai models were made. At times, finished vehicles were imported from Mozambique, disassembled, reassembled and exported to South Africa in order to - compared to the direct import to South Africa - gain significant tax advantages.

In 2000, the company - along with the Swedish Motor Corporation at the same location - went bankrupt with high debts.

== Model overview ==
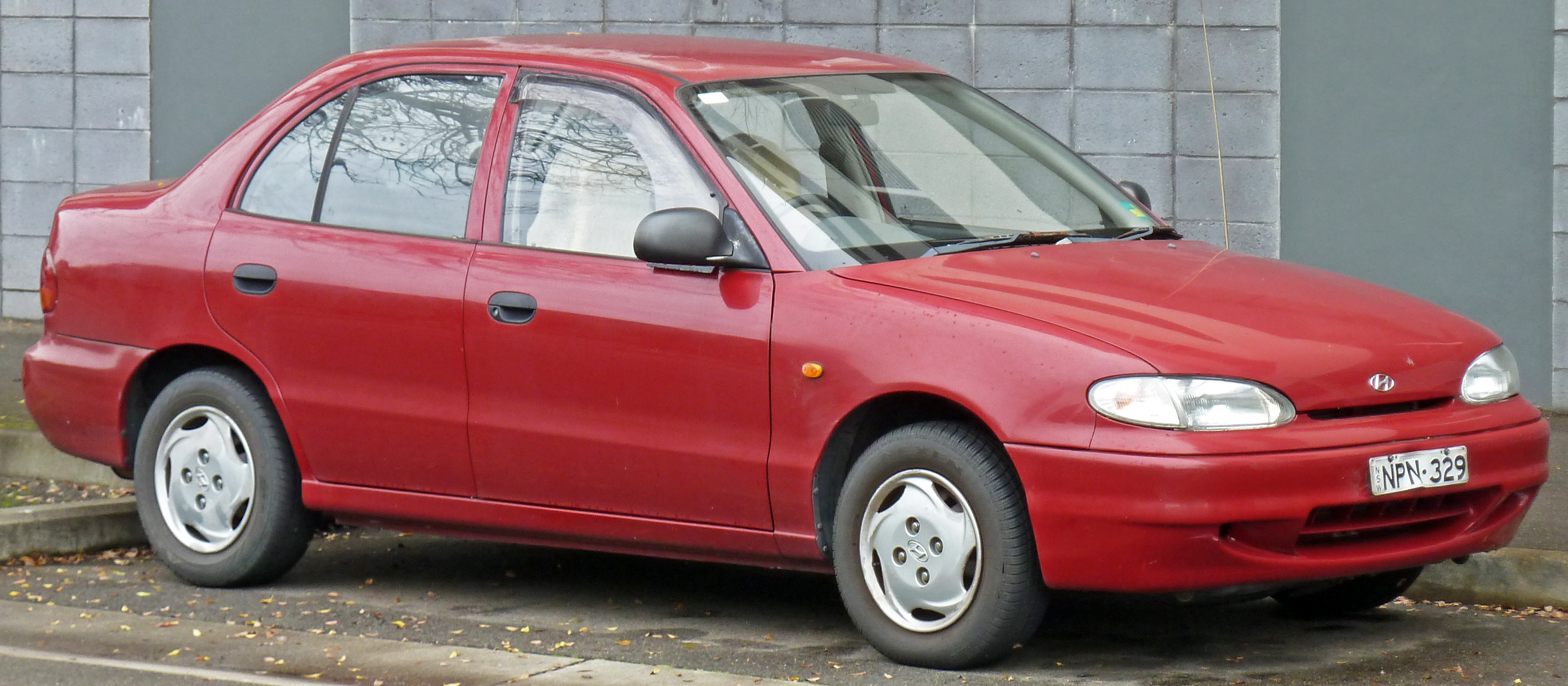
Hyundai Accent
1993–2001

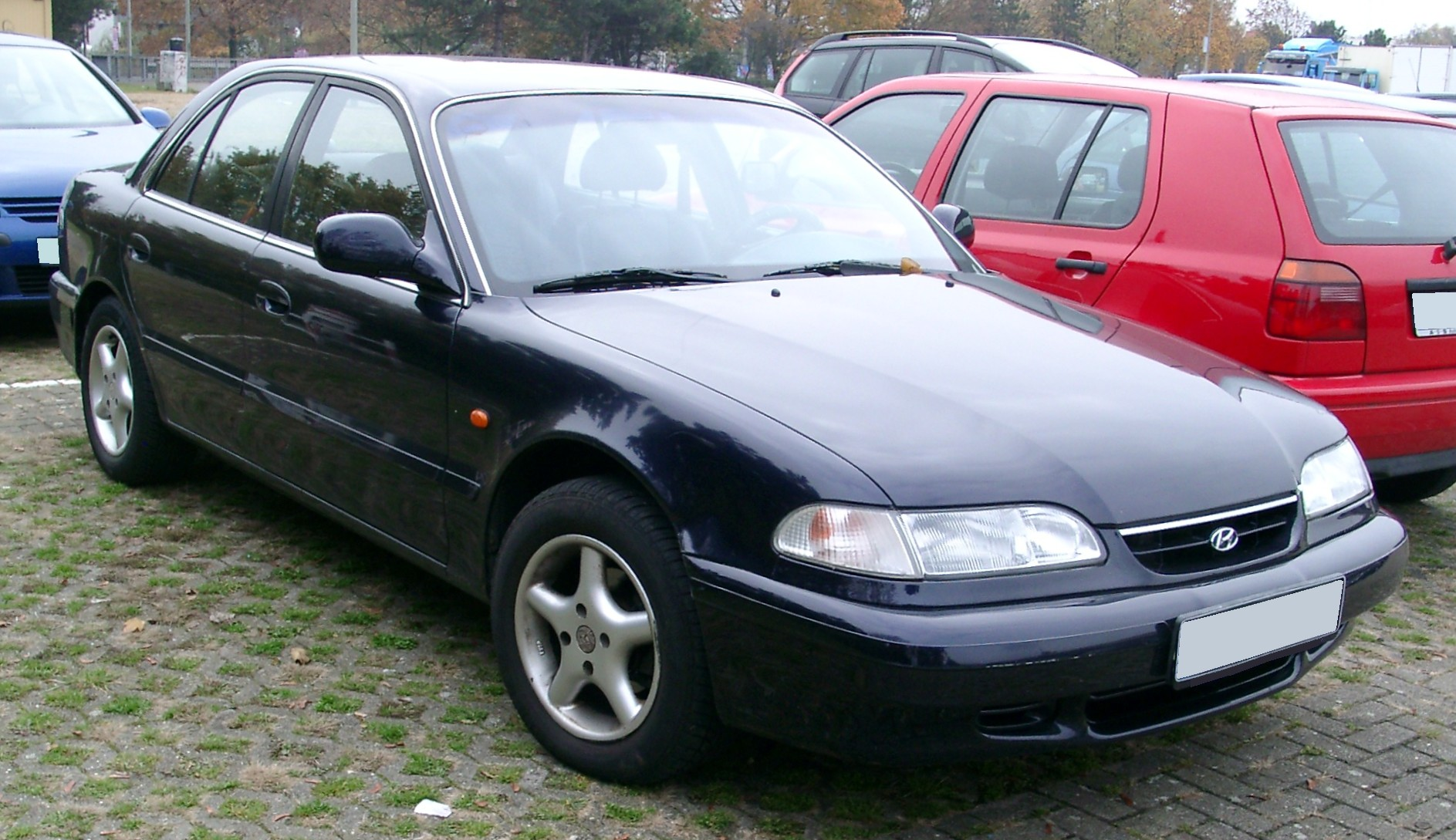
Hyundai Sonata
1993–1998

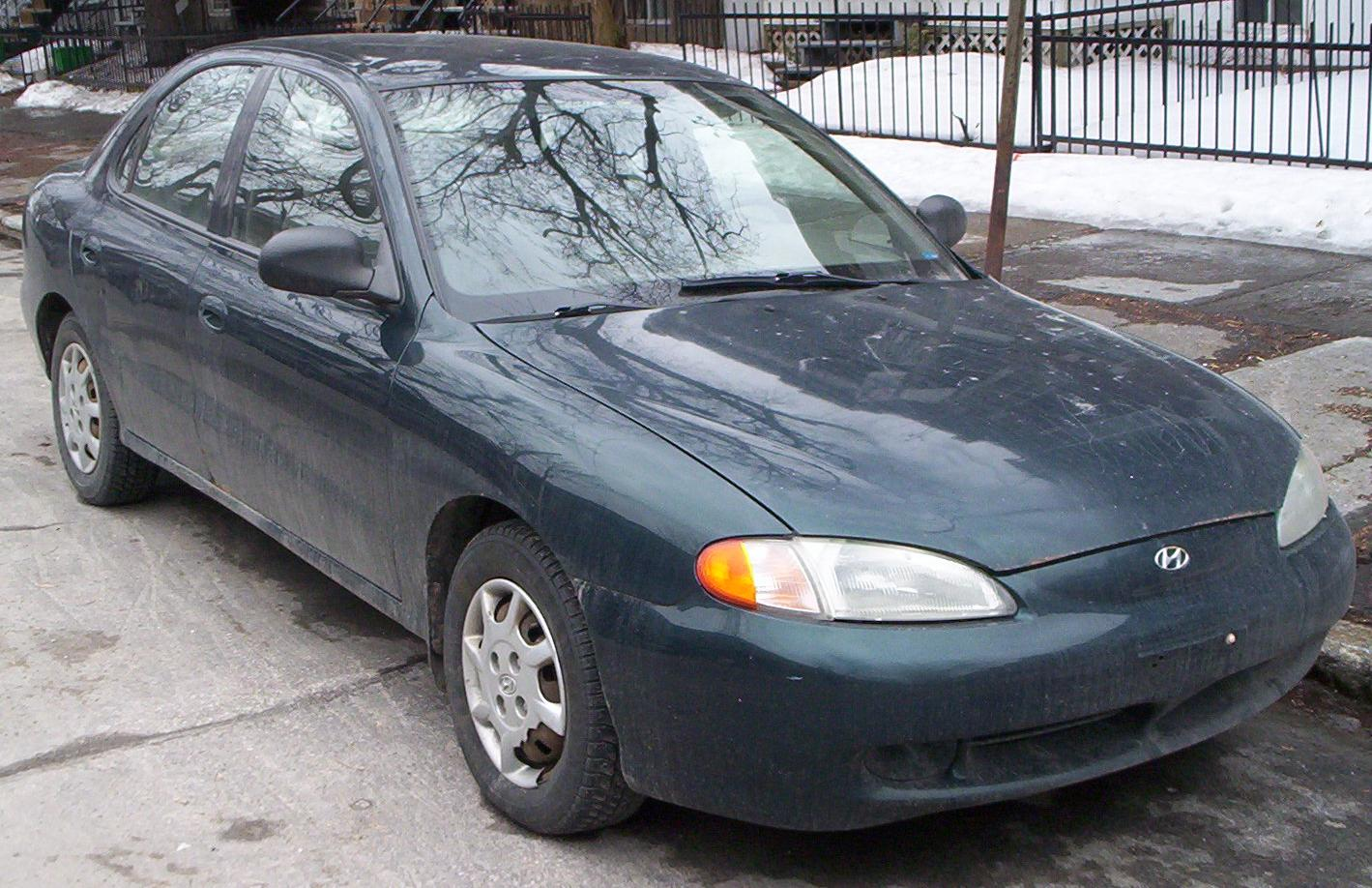
Hyundai Elantra
1996–1999

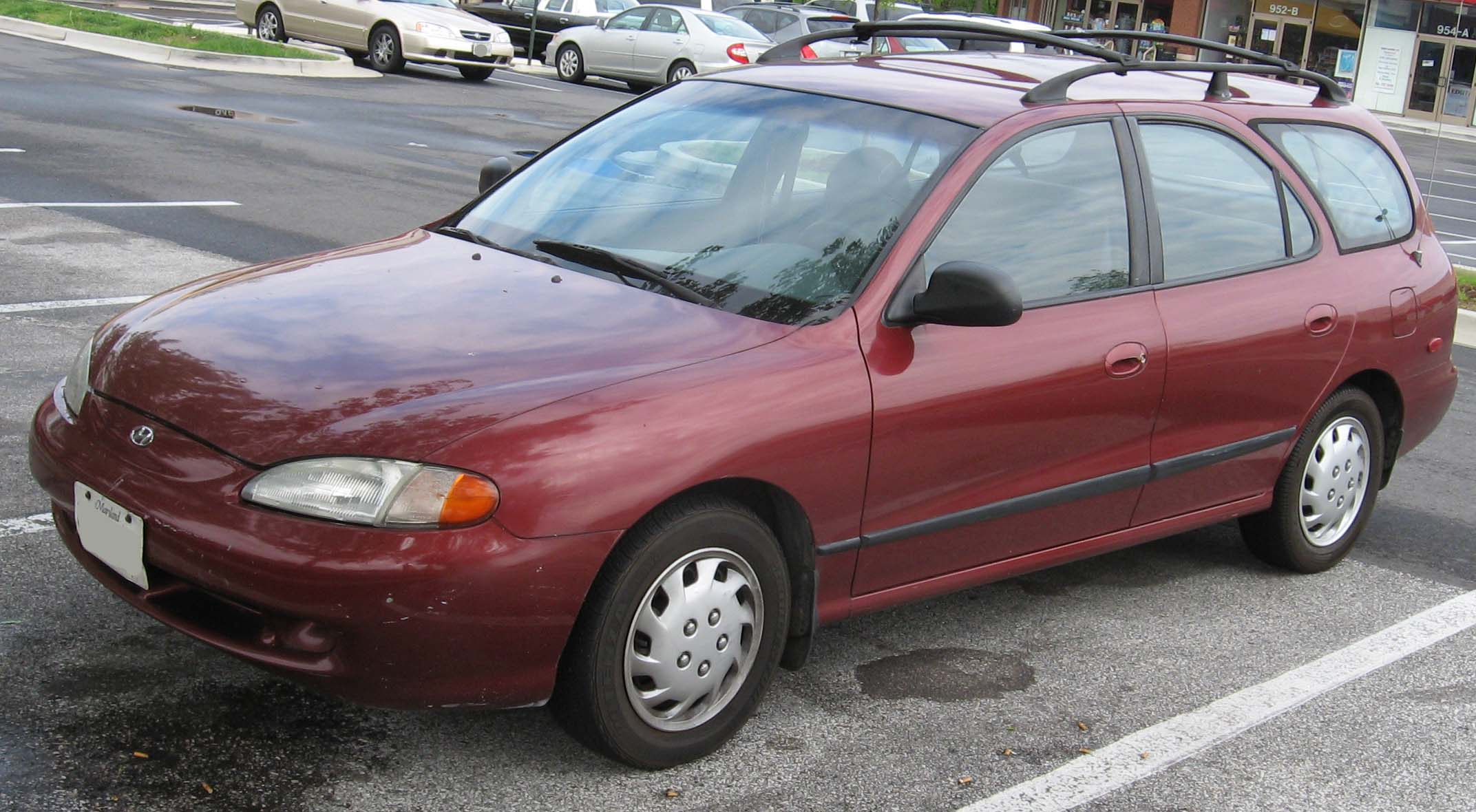
Hyundai Elantra Station Wagon
1996–1999

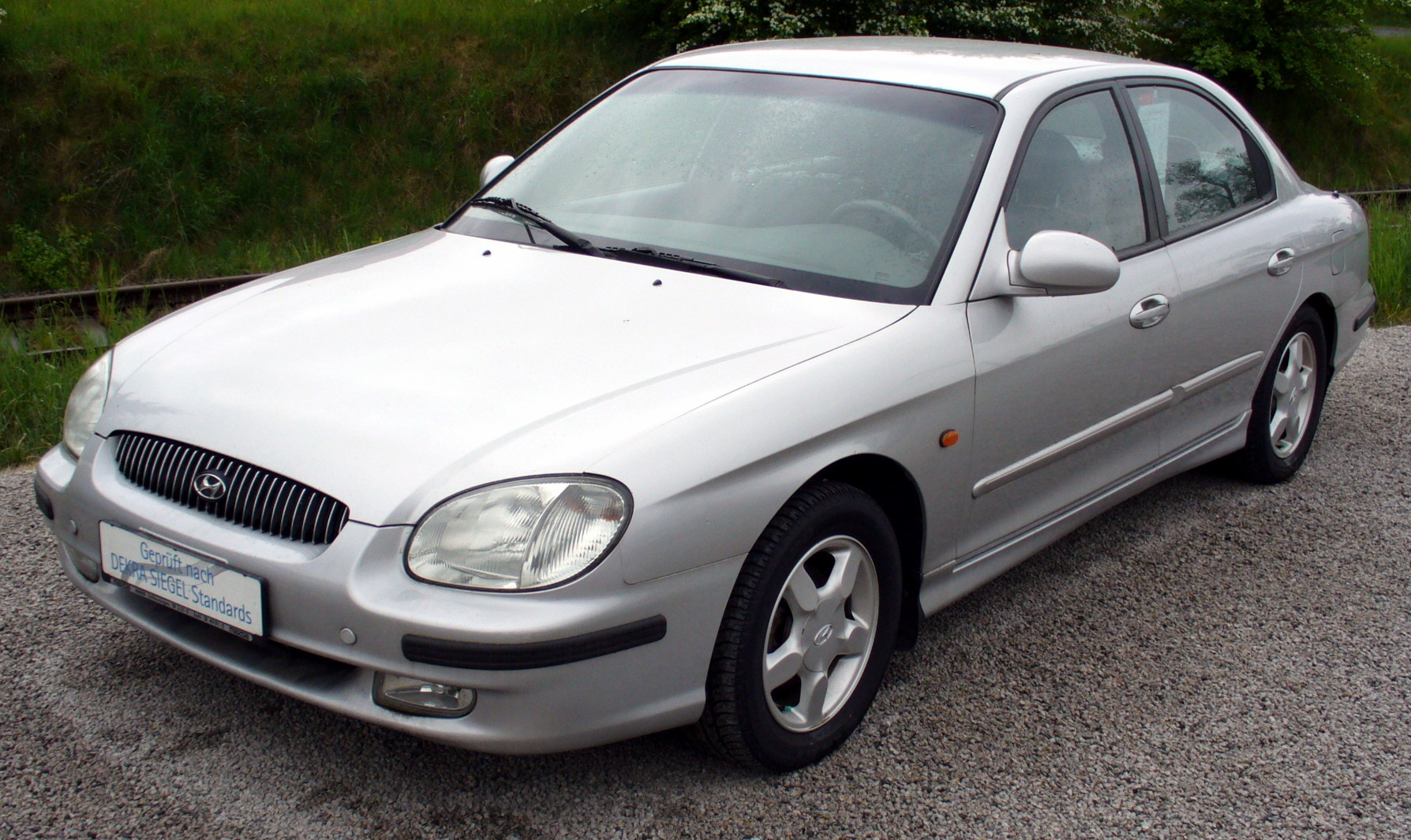
Hyundai Sonata Viv
1998–2001

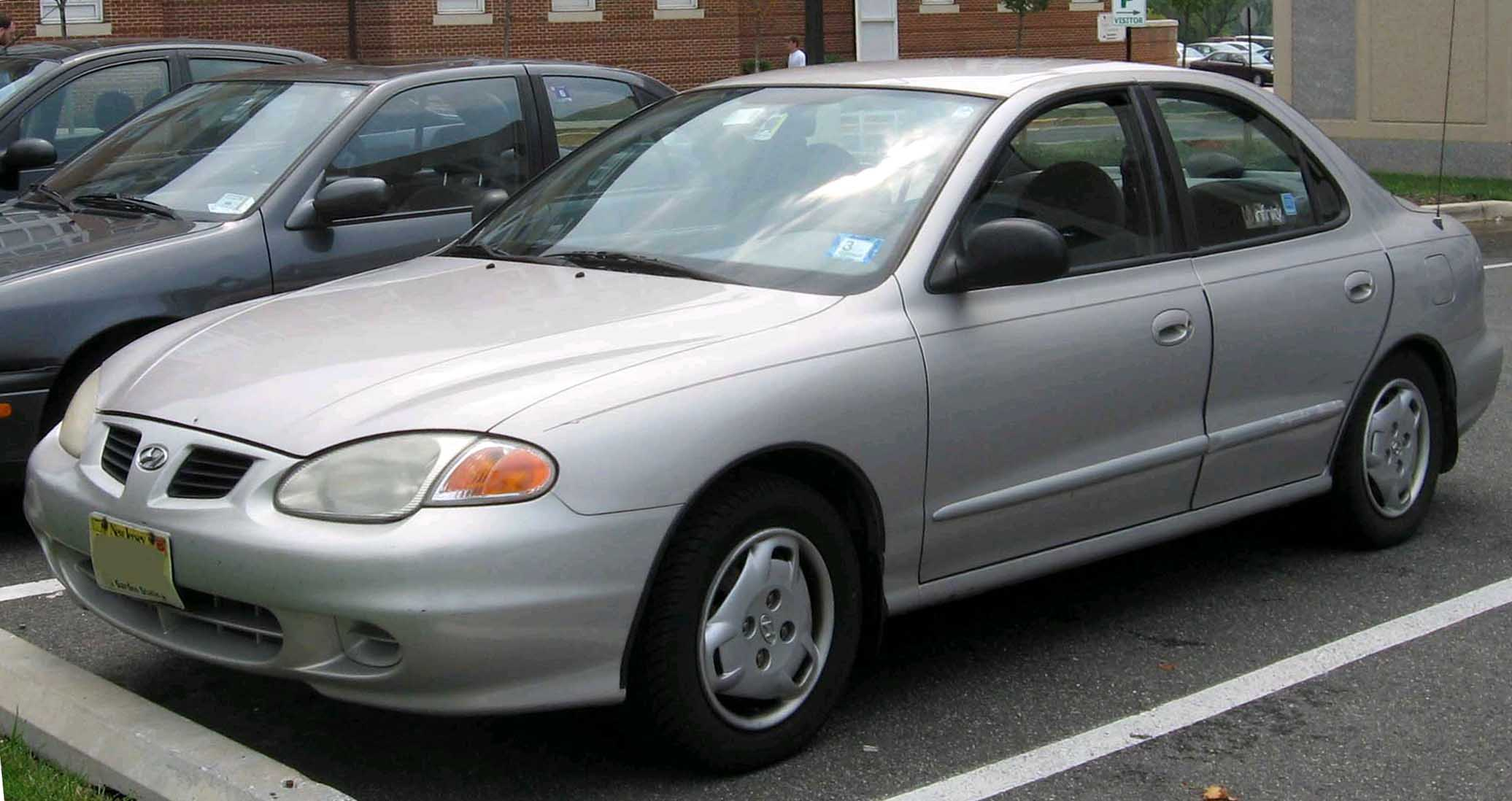
Hyundai Elantra
1999–2001

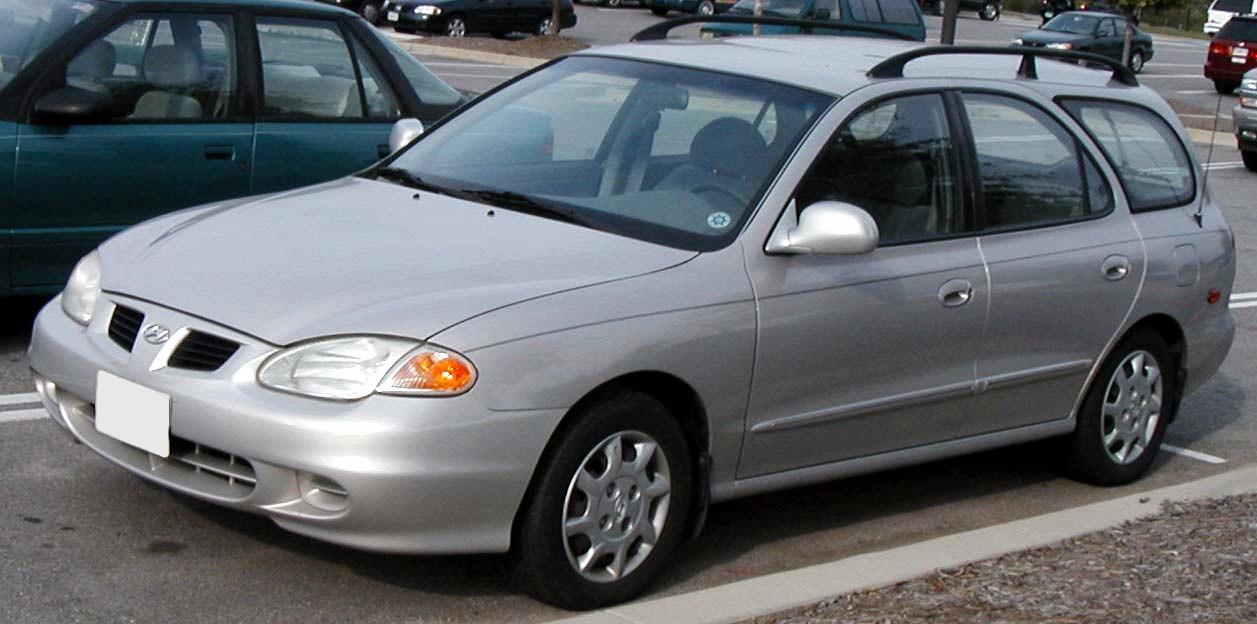
Hyundai Elantra Station Wagon
1999–2001
