= Renal agenesis =

Failure of the kidney(s) to develop during embryonic growth

- Specialty: Nephrology

Renal agenesis is a medical condition in which one (unilateral) or both (bilateral) fetal kidneys fail to develop.

Unilateral and bilateral renal agenesis in humans, mice and zebra fish has been linked to mutations in the gene GREB1L. It has also been associated with mutations in the genes RET or UPK3A in humans and mice respectively.

== Type ==
=== Bilateral ===
Bilateral renal agenesis (BRA) is a condition in which both kidneys of a fetus fail to develop during gestation. It is incompatible with life. It is one causative agent of Potter sequence. This absence of kidneys causes oligohydramnios, a deficiency of amniotic fluid in a pregnancy, which can place extra pressure on the developing baby and cause further malformations. The condition is frequently, but not always the result of a genetic disorder, and is more common in infants born to one or more parents with a malformed or absent kidney.

=== Unilateral ===
This is much more common, but is not usually of any major health consequence, as long as the single kidney is healthy. However, this kidney tends to be hypertrophied, ectopic and prone to infection and damage.

It may be associated with an increased incidence of Müllerian duct abnormalities, which are abnormalities of the development of the female reproductive tract and can be a cause of infertility, blocked menstrual flow (hematocolpos), increased need for Caesarean sections, or other problems. Herlyn–Werner–Wunderlich syndrome is one such syndrome in which unilateral renal agenesis is combined with a blind hemivagina and uterus didelphys. Up to 40% of women with a urogenital tract anomaly also have an associated renal tract anomaly.

Adults with unilateral renal agenesis have considerably higher chances of hypertension (high blood pressure). People with this condition are advised to approach contact sports with caution.

A possible complication later in life of unilateral renal agenesis is focal segmental glomerular sclerosis (FSGS) which will cause nephrotic syndrome, potentially resulting from glomerular overload.

== Genetics ==
In 2008 researchers found autosomal dominant mutations in the RET and GDNF genes to be linked to renal agenesis in unrelated stillborn fetuses through PCR and direct sequence analysis. In the study, DNA from 33 stillborn fetuses were sequenced for mutations in RET, GDNF and GFRA1. Nineteen of the fetuses had BRA, ten had URA and 4 had congenital renal dysplasia. Seven of the 19 BRA fetuses were found to have a mutation in the RET gene (37%), while two of the ten URA fetuses did (20%). One of the URA fetuses had two RET mutations and one GDNF mutation. There were no GFRA1 mutations found.

However, the results of Skinner et al. study were questioned by a more recent study with a larger number of cases. In this study 105 fetuses were analyzed. Sixty-five fetuses had BRA while 24 had URA with an abnormal contralateral kidney. Mutations in the RET gene were only found in seven of the fetuses (6.6%).

In 2014 researchers found autosomal recessive mutations in ITGA8 in three members of two unrelated families utilizing exome sequencing. One of the families was consanguineous.

In 2017 researchers identified heritable autosomal dominant mutations in the gene GREB1L in two unrelated families as being the cause of both BRA and URA utilizing Exome Sequencing and direct sequencing analysis. This is the first reported genetic lesion implicated in the activation of Retinoic Acid Receptor (RAR) Targets that has been associated with renal agenesis in humans. The researchers found two different GREB1L mutations, each being unique to their respective pedigrees. In total, there were 23 individuals analyzed between the two families, four of which had BRA and five of which had URA. GREB1L mutations were identified in all of the affected individuals as well as in three unaffected family members, demonstrating incomplete penetrance and variable expressivity.

There are several hundred to perhaps several thousand genes that, if they had the right kind of mutation, could lead to renal agenesis in humans. It is possible that each individual or family experiencing renal agenesis has a unique gene or genetic mutation causing the condition due to the fact that there are so many genes that are critical to proper renal development.

Chromosomal anomalies have been associated with BRA in certain cases (chromosomes 1, 2, 5 and 21), but these anomalies were not inherited and have not been observed in subsequent cases. Additionally, neither extreme substance abuse nor environmental factors (high power line, mercury, ground water issues, etc.) have been reported to be linked to an increased incidence of BRA or other cause of Potter sequence. However, renal agenesis and other causes of oligohydramnios sequence have been linked to a number of other conditions and syndromes to include Down syndrome, Kallmann syndrome, branchio-oto-renal syndrome and others.

== Prevalence ==
The prevalence of unilateral renal agenesis in the population is approximately 1 in about 1000 people. Bilateral agenesis occurs in 1 in about 2500 foetuses.
