= Hereditary mucoepithelial dysplasia =

- Other names: Urban-Schosser-Spohn syndrome, HMD
- Structure and location of desmosomes Gap junctions, connecting the interior of two cells
- Malformation of desmosomes and gap junctions are caused in this condition
- Specialty: Dermatology

Hereditary mucoepithelial dysplasia (HMD), or simply mucoepithelial dysplasia, is a rare autosomal dominant multiepithelial disorder causing systemic maldevelopment of the epithelia and mucous membranes that line the surface of tissues and structures throughout the body, particularly affecting systems affiliated with mucosa, which includes the respiratory, digestive, urinary, reproductive and immune systems. The disorder is attributed to improper formation of desmosomes and gap junctions, which prevents proper cornification of the epithelial layer of the skin.

== Pathophysiology ==
Desmosomes are extracellular protein structures responsible for cellular adhesion, whereby cells of the same type are held closely together. Gap junctions are specialized channels located within the cell membrane of many animal cell types, which serve as gateways that connect the cytoplasmic interior of two adjacent cells, allowing the passage of small molecules such as ions, nucleotides, second messengers and others. The movement and exchange of small molecules between cells is an important part of intracellular communication processes like cell signaling.
