= Triphalangeal thumb =

Birth defect of an extra phalangeal bone and joint in the thumb

- Finger-like appearance
- Specialty: Medical genetics, plastic surgery
- Differential diagnosis: Radial dysplasia (without retroflexion)
- Treatment: Surgical relocation and removal of the extra phalange of the thumb

Triphalangeal thumb (TPT) is a congenital malformation where the thumb has three phalanges instead of two. The extra phalangeal bone can vary in size from that of a small pebble to a size comparable to the phalanges in non-thumb digits. The true incidence of the condition is unknown, but is estimated at 1:25,000 live births. In about two-thirds of the patients with triphalangeal thumbs, there is a hereditary component. Besides the three phalanges, there can also be other malformations. It was first described by Columbi in 1559.

== Signs and symptoms ==
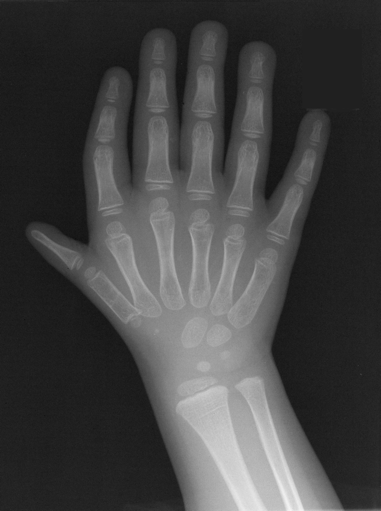
In combination with polydactyly

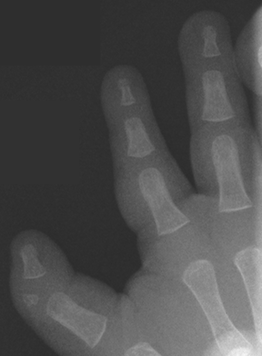
Delta shaped extra phalanx

The triphalangeal thumb has a different appearance than normal thumbs. The appearance can differ widely; the thumb can be a longer thumb, it can be deviated in the radio-ulnar plane (clinodactyly), or thumb strength can be diminished. In the case of a five-fingered hand it has a finger-like appearance, with the position in the plane of the four fingers, thenar muscle deficiency, and additional length. The flexion and extension can be limited as well.There is often a combination with radial polydactyly.

=== Complications ===
Generally, triphalangeal thumbs are non-opposable. In contrast to most people with opposable thumbs, a person suffering from TPT cannot easily place their thumb opposite the other four digits of the same hand. The opposable thumb's ability to effortlessly utilize fingers in a "pinch" formation is critical in precision gripping. For the thumb to adequately grip, certain thumb criteria must be met (e.g. suitable position and length, stable joints and good thenar muscle strength). Because triphalangeal thumbs cannot easily oppose and do not possess many of the optimal qualities found in most opposable thumbs, they tend to cause the hand to be less effective in use and, therefore, prove to be more problematic in daily life.

== Cause ==
Malformations of the upper extremities can occur in the third to seventh embryonic week. In some cases the TPT is hereditary. In these cases, there is a mutation on chromosome 7q36. If the TPT is hereditary, it is mostly inherited as an autosomal dominant trait, non-opposable and bilateral. The sporadic cases are mostly opposable and unilateral.

=== Syndromes ===
Triphalangeal thumb can occur in syndromes but it can also be isolated. The triphalangeal thumb can appear in combination with other malformations or syndromes.

Syndromes include:

- Holt–Oram syndrome
- Aase syndrome
- Diamond–Blackfan anemia
- Townes–Brocks syndrome

Malformations include:

- Radial polydactyly
- Syndactyly
- Claw-like hand or foot

== Diagnosis ==
The diagnosis can be made on a physical examination and on an X-ray.

=== Classifications ===
There are multiple classifications for the triphalangeal thumb. The reason for these different classifications is the heterogeneity in appearance of the TPT. The classification according to Wood describes the shape of the extra phalanx: delta (Fig. 4), rectangular or full phalanx (Table 1). With the classification made by Buck-Gramcko a surgical treatment can be chosen (Table 1). Buck-Gramcko differentiates between six different shapes of the extra phalanx and associated malformations.

Table 1: Classifications of Wood and Buck-Gramcko

Classification according to Wood by shape of the extra phalanx	Shape	Classification according to Buck-Gramcko by shape/size of extra phalanx and associated malformations	Shape
I	Delta	I	Rudimentary triphalangism
		II	Short triangular middle phalanx (brachymesophalangeal)
II	Rectangular	III	Trapezoidal middle phalanx (intermediate)
		IV	Long rectangular middle phalanx (dolichophalangeal)
III	Full	V	Hypoplastic triphalangeal thumb
		VI	Triphalangeal thumb associated with polydactyly

== Treatment ==
The goals of surgical treatment are: reducing length of the thumb, creating a good functioning, a stable and non-deviated joint and improving the position of the thumb if necessary. Hereby improving function of the hand and thumb.

In general the surgical treatment is done for improvement of the thumb function. However, an extra advantage of the surgery is the improvement in appearance of the thumb. In the past, surgical treatment of the triphalangeal thumb was not indicated, but now it is generally agreed that operative treatment improves function and appearance. Because an operation was not indicated in the past, there's still a population with an untreated triphalangeal thumb. The majority of this population doesn't want surgery, because the daily functioning of the hand is good. The main obstacle for the untreated patients might not be the diminished function, but the appearance of the triphalangeal thumb. The timing of surgery differs between Wood and Buck-Gramcko. Wood advises operation between the age of six months and two years, while Buck-Gramcko advises to operate for all indications before the age of six years.

- For TPT types I and II of the Buck-Gramcko classification, the surgical treatment typically consists of removing the extra phalanx and reconstructing the ulnar collateral ligament and the radial collateral ligament if necessary.
- For type III of Buck-Gramcko classification proposable surgical treatments:

- Smaller trapezoidal phalanx and under six years: removal of the extra phalanx and reconstruction of the ulnar collateral ligament. Lengthening of the radial collateral ligament is only indicated when the clinodactyly is still present after reconstruction of the ulnar collateral ligament.
- Trapezoidal phalanx and older than six years: partial removal of the extra phalanx with correction of the angle. Arthrodesis of the distal interphalangeal joint (DIP).

- For type IV of Buck-Gramcko classification the surgical treatment typically consists of an osteotomy which reduces the middle phalanx and arthrodesis of the DIP. This gives a shortening of 1 to 1.5 cm. In most cases, this technique is combined with a shortening, rotation and palmar abduction osteotomy at metacarpal level to correct for position and length of the thumb. The extensor tendons and the intrinsic muscles are shortened as well.
- For type V of the Buck-Gramcko classification the surgical treatment proposably consists of a "pollicization". With a pollicization the malpositioned thumb is repositioned, rotated and shortened, the above-described rotation reduction osteotomy of the first metacarpal can be performed as well.
- For type VI of the Buck-Gramcko classification, the surgical treatment typically consists of removing the additional mostly hypoplastic thumb(s). Further procedures of reconstruction of the triphalangeal thumb are performed according to the shape of the extra phalanx as described above.
