= Ulnar dysplasia =

- Other names: Ulnar hypoplasia/aplasia, congenital ulnar deficiency
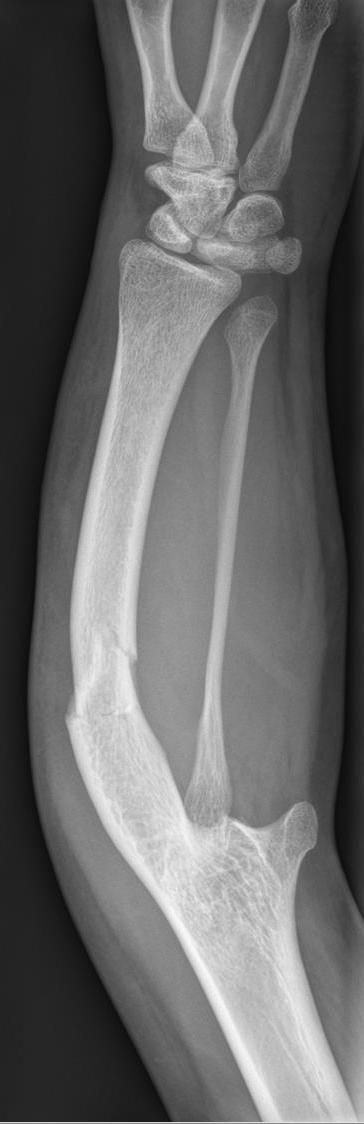
- Ulnar hypoplasia
- Specialty: Medical genetics
- Symptoms: Missing or underdeveloped ulnae bone
- Complications: Grip, arm movement
- Usual onset: Birth
- Duration: Life-long
- Causes: Genetic mutation, problem during embryonic life
- Diagnostic method: Physical evaluation, X-ray
- Frequency: very rare, occurs in about 1 in 100,000 live births

Ulnar dysplasia also known as ulnar longitudinal deficiency, ulnar club hand or ulnar aplasia/hypoplasia is a rare congenital malformation which consists of an underdeveloped or missing ulnae bone, causing an ulnar deviation of the entire wrist. The muscles and nerves in the hand may be missing or unbalanced. In severe cases, ulnar digits (e.g. ring and pinky finger) may be missing. Sometimes, radial dysplasia occurs alongside this malformation. This condition occurs in 1 in 100,000 live births. Sometimes, other orthopedic problems occur alongside this malformation, such as scoliosis.

== Types ==
There are four types of ulnar dysplasia:

Type 1: The mildest type of ulnar dysplasia. The ulnae is slightly shorter than average and there is a barely noticeable wrist deviation

Type 2: The ulnae is moderately-severely smaller than normal. The radius is deviated and so is the hand

Type 3: The ulnae is completely missing. The radius is even more deviated, causing a severe ulnar deviation of the hand.

Type 4: The most severe type of ulnar dysplasia, the ulnae is completely missing, and the wrist is severely deviated. The elbow bones are fused together, so the elbow has reduced mobility

== See also ==
- Radial dysplasia
- Van De Berghe Dequeker syndrome
- Ulnar nerve entrapment
