= Radial dysplasia =

- Other names: Radial longitudinal deficiency
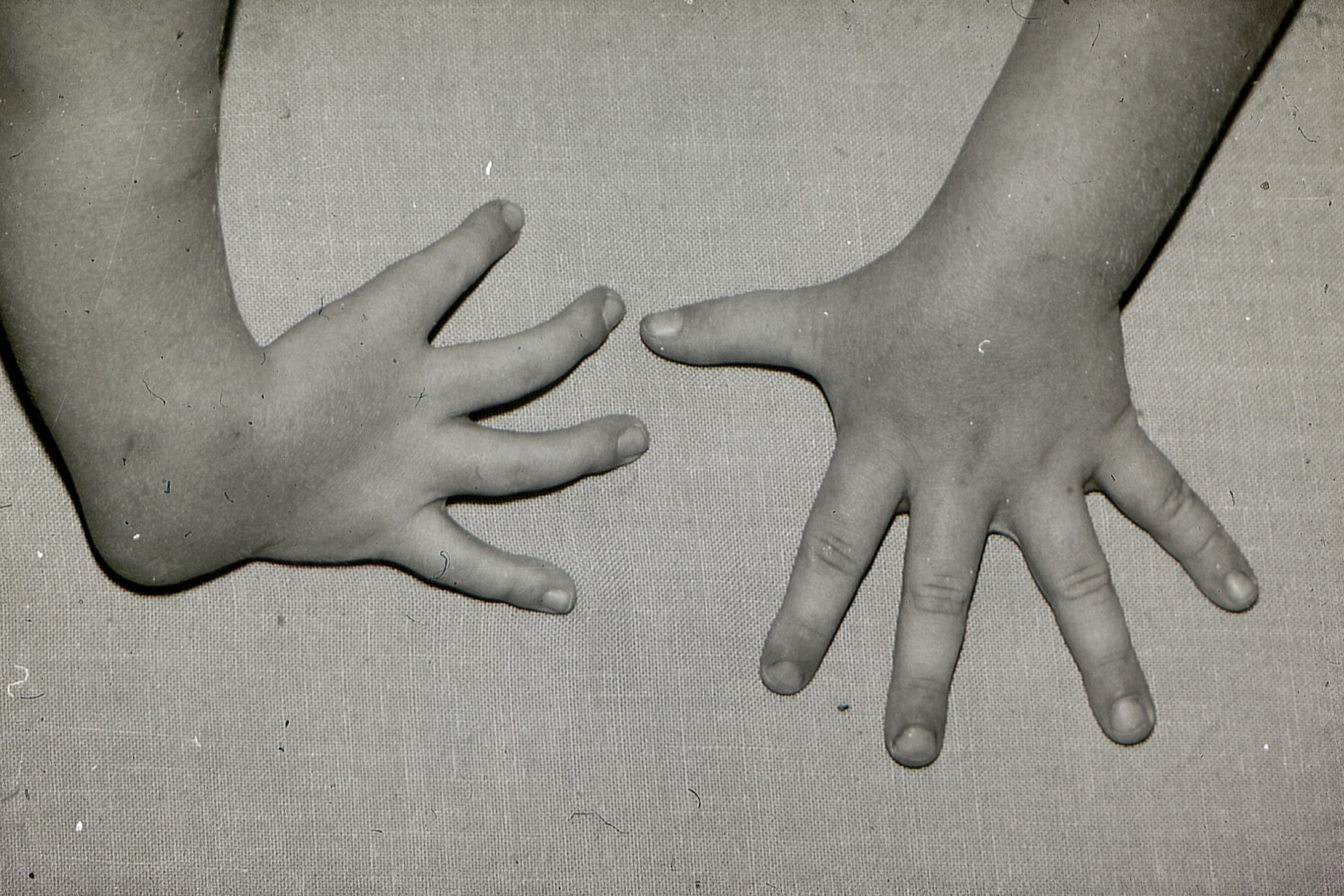
- Radial club hand with thumb missing (ectrodactyly)

Radial dysplasia, also known as radial club hand or radial longitudinal deficiency, is a congenital difference occurring in a longitudinal direction resulting in radial deviation of the wrist and shortening of the forearm. It can occur in different ways, from a minor anomaly to complete absence of the radius, radial side of the carpal bones and thumb. Hypoplasia of the distal humerus may be present as well and can lead to stiffness of the elbow. Radial deviation of the wrist is caused by lack of support to the carpus, radial deviation may be reinforced if forearm muscles are functioning poorly or have abnormal insertions. Although radial longitudinal deficiency is often bilateral, the extent of involvement is most often asymmetric.

The incidence is between 1:30,000 and 1:100,000 and it is more often a sporadic mutation rather than an inherited condition. It is one of the possible co occurring birth defects of the embryonic mesoderm within VACTERL association. In case of an inherited condition, several syndromes are known for an association with radial dysplasia, such as the cardiovascular Holt–Oram syndrome and the hematologic Fanconi anemia and TAR syndrome.Other possible causes are an injury to the apical ectodermal ridge during upper limb development, intrauterine compression, or maternal drug use (thalidomide).

== Classification ==
Classification of radial dysplasia is practised through different models. Some only include the different deformities or absences of the radius, where others also include anomalies of the thumb and carpal bones. The Bayne and Klug classification discriminates four different types of radial dysplasia. A fifth type was added by Goldfarb et al. describing a radial dysplasia with participation of the humerus. In this classification only anomalies of the radius and the humerus are taken in consideration. James and colleagues expanded this classification by including deficiencies of the carpal bones with a normal distal radius length as type 0 and isolated thumb anomalies as type N.

Type N: Isolated thumb anomaly
Type 0: Deficiency of the carpal bones
Type I: Short distal radius
Type II: Hypoplastic radius in miniature
Type III: Absent distal radius
Type IV: Complete absent radius
Type V: Complete absent radius and manifestations in the proximal humerus

The term absent radius can refer to the last 3 types.

== Treatment ==
=== Splinting and stretching ===
In cases of a minor deviation of the wrist, treatment by splinting and stretching alone may be a sufficient approach in treating the radial deviation in RD. Besides that, the parent can support this treatment by performing passive exercises of the hand. This will help to stretch the wrist and also possibly correct any extension contracture of the elbow. Furthermore, splinting is used as a postoperative measure trying to avoid a relapse of the radial deviation.

=== Centralization ===
More severe types (Bayne type III en IV) of radial dysplasia can be treated with surgical intervention. The main goal of centralization is to increase hand function by positioning the hand over the distal ulna, and stabilizing the wrist in straight position. Splinting or soft-tissue distraction may be used preceding the centralization. In classic centralization central portions of the carpus are removed to create a notch for placement of the ulna. A different approach is to place the metacarpal of the middle finger in line with the ulna with a fixation pin.

If radial tissues are still too short after soft-tissue stretching, soft tissue release and different approaches for manipulation of the forearm bones may be used to enable the placement of the hand onto the ulna. Possible approaches are shortening of the ulna by resection of a segment, or removing carpal bones. If the ulna is significantly bent, osteotomy may be needed to straighten the ulna. After placing the wrist in the correct position, radial wrist extensors are transferred to the extensor carpi ulnaris tendon, to help stabilize the wrist in straight position. If the thumb or its carpometacarpal joint is absent, centralization can be followed by pollicization. Postoperatively, a long arm plaster splinter has to be worn for at least 6 to 8 weeks. A removable splint is often worn for a long period of time.

Radial angulation of the hand enables patients with stiff elbows to reach their mouth for feeding; therefore treatment is contraindicated in cases of extension contracture of the elbow. A risk of centralization is that the procedure may cause injury to the ulnar physis, leading to early epiphyseal arrest of the ulna, and thereby resulting in an even shorter forearm. Sestero et al. reported that ulnar growth after centralization reaches from 48% to 58% of normal ulnar length, while ulnar growth in untreated patients reaches 64% of normal ulnar length. Several reviews note that centralization can only partially correct radial deviation of the wrist and that studies with longterm follow-up show relapse of radial deviation.

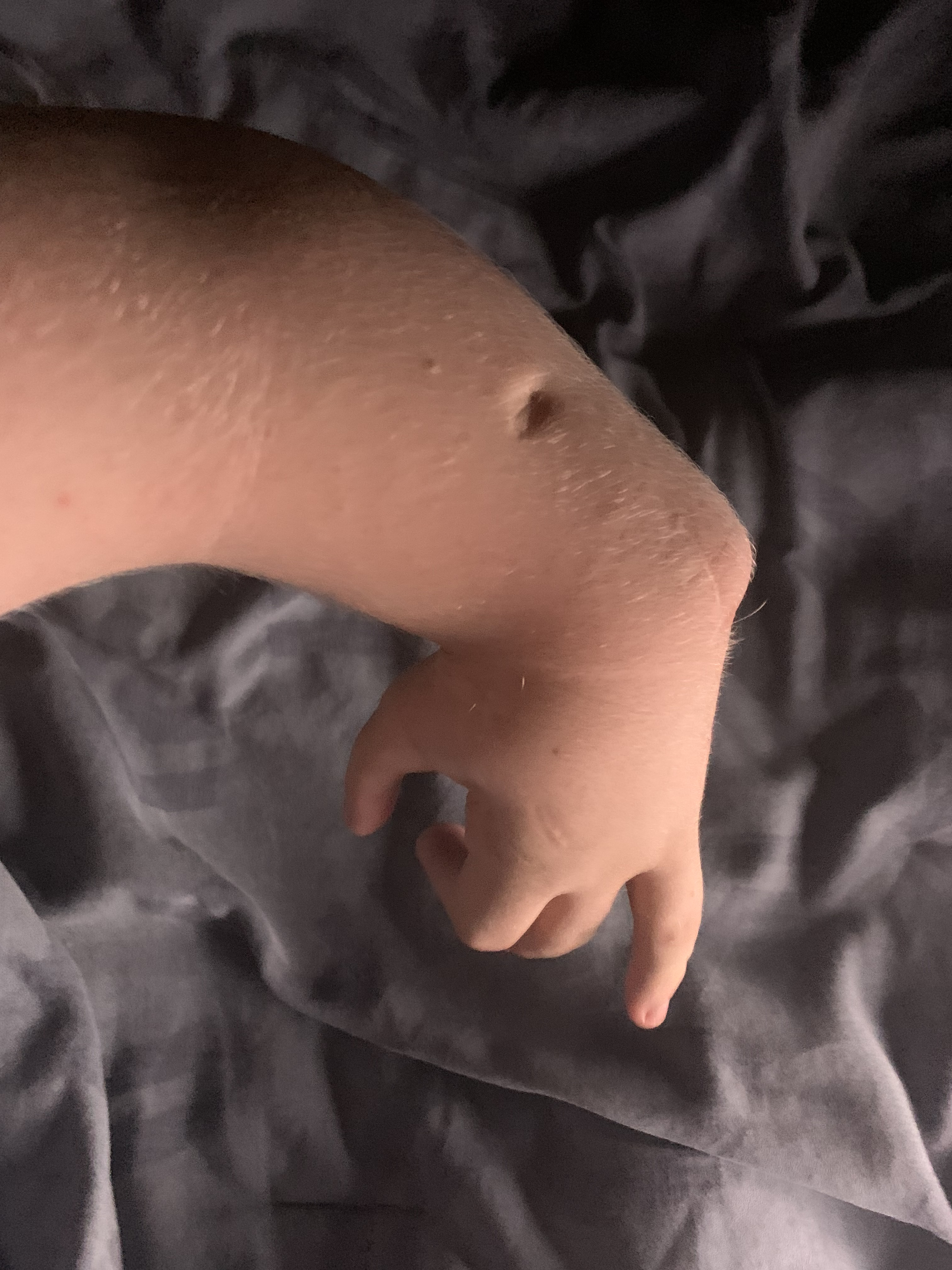
A treated radial club hand with Type N-IV using centralization with many marks where fixation pins via an external fixation device went in. The thumb in the picture is the index finger removed and stitched to where the thumb should be located on a normal hand.

=== Radialization ===
Buck-Gramcko described another operation technique, for treatment of radial dysplasia, which is called radialization. During radialization the metacarpal of the index finger is pinned onto the ulna and radial wrist extensors are attached to the ulnar side of the wrist, causing overcorrection or ulnar deviation. This overcorrection is believed to make relapse of radial deviation less likely.

=== Vascularized metatarsophalangeal (MTP)-joint transfer ===
Villki reported a different approach in During this procedure a vascularised MTP-joint of the second toe is transferred to the radial side of ulna, creating a platform that provides radial support for the wrist. The graft is vascularised and therefore maintains its ability to join the growth of the supporting ulna.

Prior to the actual transfer of the MTP-joint of the second toe soft-tissue distraction of the wrist is required to create enough space to place the MTP joint. When after several weeks enough space has been created through distraction, the actual transfer of the MTP joint can be initiated. During this surgical intervention the wrist and the second toe are prepared for transfer at the same time. The ipsilateral second toe MTP joint, together with its metatarsal arteries, its extensor and flexor tendons and its dorsal nerves to the skin, is harvested for transfer. The distal and middle phalanx of the toe are removed. The transferred toe, consisting of the metatarsal and proximal phalanx, is fixed between the physis of the ulna and the second metacarpal, or the scaphoid. The tendons of the toe are attached to those of the radial flexor and extensors muscles of the wrist to create more stability to the MTP joint. K-wires are placed to fixate the bones in the desired position. Once the bones are secured anastomosis are made between the vessels of the toe and the vessels of the forearm. After revascularization of the toe, the skin paddle is placed and the skin is closed.

Vilkki et al. have conducted a study on 19 forearms treated with vascularized MTP-joint transfer with a mean follow-up of 11 years which reports an ulnar length of 67% compared to the contralateral side. De Jong et al. described in a review that compared to study outcomes on centralization, Vilkki reported a smaller deviation postoperatively and a lower severity of the relapse.

== See also ==
- Ulnar dysplasia
- Radius
