= Circumvallate placenta =

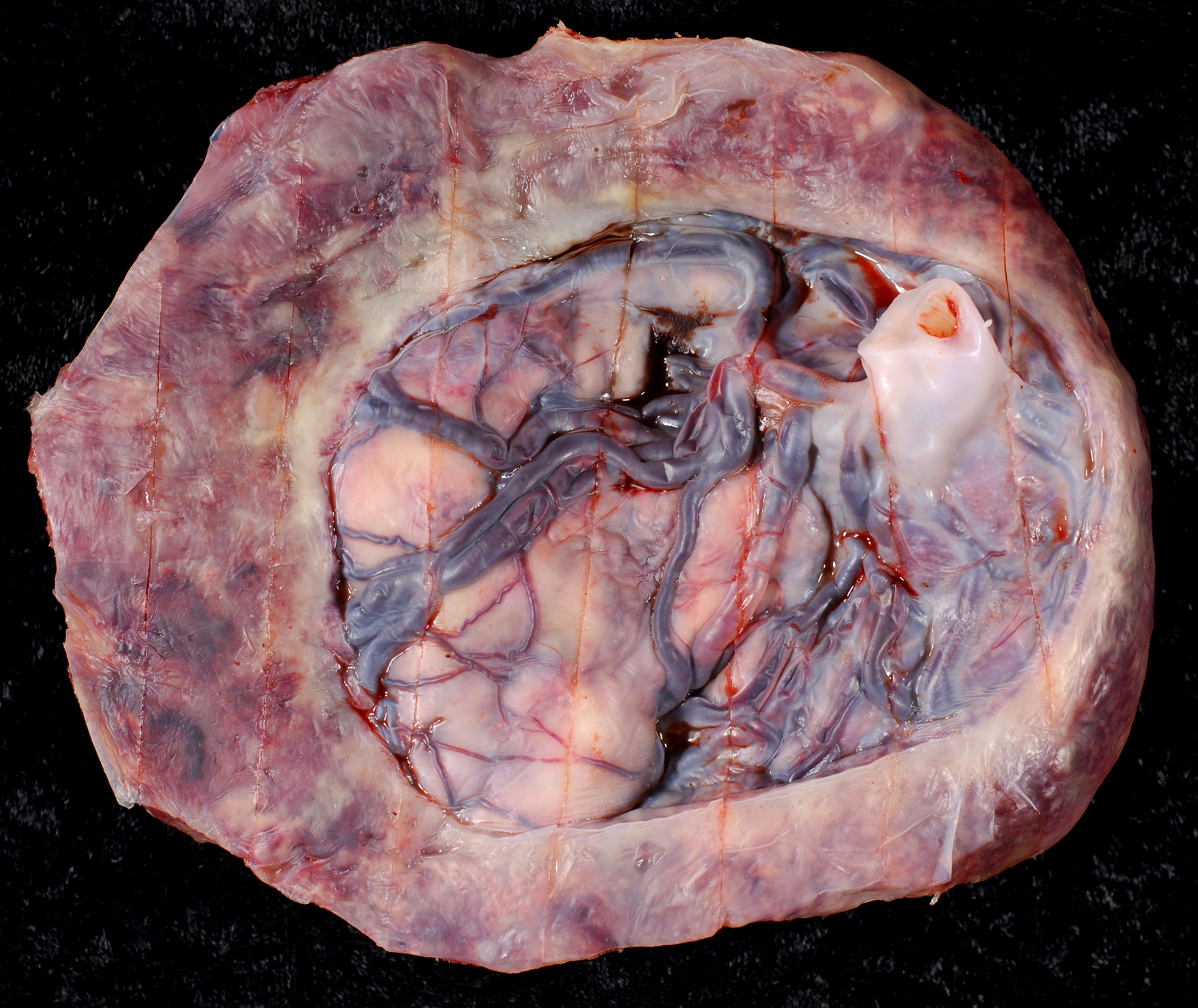
- The thickened ring of membranes on the fetal surface of a circumvallate placenta, making it appear as though the central part of the placenta has been exposed.
- Specialty: Obstetrics

Circumvallate placenta is a rare condition affecting about 1–2% of pregnancies, in which the amnion and chorion fetal membranes essentially "double back" on the fetal side around the edges of the placenta. After delivery, a circumvallate placenta has a thick ring of membranes on its fetal surface. Circumvallate placenta is a placental morphological abnormality associated with increased fetal morbidity and mortality due to the restricted availability of nutrients and oxygen to the developing fetus.

Physicians may be able to detect a circumvallate placenta during pregnancy by using an ultrasound. However, in other cases, a circumvallate placenta is not identified until delivery of the baby. Circumvallate placenta can increase the risk of associated complications such as preterm delivery and placental abruption. Occasionally, a circumvallate placenta can also increase the risk of neonatal death and emergency caesarean section. Although there is no existing treatment for circumvallate placenta, physicians can attempt to minimize the effects of complications, if they occur, through frequent fetal monitoring and, if necessary, emergency cesarean section.

In a circumvallate placenta, the chorionic plate, which forms the fetal surface of the placenta, tends to be smaller than the basal plate, which forms the maternal surface of the placenta. This results in the elevation of the placental margin and the appearance of an annular shape. The fetal surface is divided into a central depressed zone surrounded by a thickened white ring which is incomplete. The ring is situated at varying distances from the margin, or edges, of the placenta. This thick ring of membranes is composed of a double fold of amnion and chorion with degenerated decidua vera and fibrin in between. Blood vessels, supplying nutrients and carrying waste products to and from the developing fetus, radiate from the umbilical cord insertion to as far as the ring of membranes, and then disappears from view.

== Signs and symptoms ==
A circumvallate placenta does not always induce associated symptoms during pregnancy, making it extremely difficult to diagnose a circumvallate placenta in asymptomatic mothers. In symptomatic mothers, physicians may be able to detect a circumvallate placenta based on the presentation of the following signs.

- Vaginal bleeding: A circumvallate placenta can increase the risk of frequent vaginal bleeding during the first trimester of pregnancy. In a study conducted with 92 women with a circumvallate placenta, it was concluded that incidences of vaginal bleeding were significantly higher in women with a circumvallate placenta during all three trimesters when compared to the control group. However, a noted limitation of the study considered by the researchers was that because the study included such a small number of women, the obtained results may not be fully representative of the general population. Because the chorionic plate is much smaller than the basal plate in a circumvallate placenta, vaginal bleeding tends to occur at this site where the placenta is exposed and uncovered. In mothers presenting with vaginal bleeding, circumvallate placenta should be suspected as a possible cause of the vaginal bleeding.
- Inhibited fetal growth: Fetuses tend to develop more slowly when associated with a circumvallate placenta, largely due to the reduced supply of blood and nutrients from mother to fetus. Physicians will order tests to determine the cause of inhibited fetal growth when a developing fetus does not meet growth expectations during the course of the pregnancy.
- Premature rupture of membranes (PROM): PROM happens when the protective covering of the amniotic sac ruptures before the onset of labor and delivery. If PROM occurs within the first 37 weeks of pregnancy, it is termed preterm premature rupture of membranes (PPROM). PROM itself has many causes and risk factors. When PROM occurs along with vaginal bleeding in the second trimester of pregnancy, it is suspected that a mother likely has a circumvallate placenta.

=== Complications ===
Circumvallate placenta has also been associated with a higher incidence of complications including placental abruption, low birth weight, premature delivery, perinatal death, and fetal abnormalities.

- Low birth weight: Lack of proper nutrition and blood flow to the fetus during pregnancy often results in decreased weight of the baby at birth.
- Placenta abruption: Placenta abruption, in which the placenta divides from the wall of the uterus prior to birth, can have severe outcomes for a mother and her baby. Such consequences include vaginal bleeding, decreased birth weight, preterm delivery, and stillbirth. Significant vaginal bleeding can induce maternal anemia and dangerously low blood pressure.
- Oligohydramnios: Insufficiency of proper volumes of amniotic fluid, a condition called oligohydramnios, can also occur as a result of a circumvallate placenta. Amniotic fluid is essential to normal fetal movement, fetal organ development, and cushioning of the fetus within the mother's uterus. It is also imperative in preventing umbilical cord compression so that the fetus is able to obtain nourishment and oxygenation from its mother.
- Premature delivery: Premature birth of the fetus occurs at less than 37 weeks of gestation, compared to full-term delivery at about 40 weeks.
- Miscarriage: Loss of a fetus prior to birth via miscarriage can transpire if any of the above complications occur without prompt intervention and treatment.

== Cause ==
Unfortunately, there is no known cause of circumvallate placenta and no major preventative measures that can be taken to minimize the risk of developing a circumvallate placenta. Circumvallate placenta is not a genetic disorder. Some potential causes of circumvallate placenta include reduced amniotic fluid pressure, circumferential hemorrhage, and superficial or deep implantation of the embryo within the uterine wall, although these potential causes are still not well-understood in terms of their relation to circumvallate placenta.

High-risk pregnancies are described as pregnancies in which a mother, the fetus, or both are put at a higher risk for developing pregnancy complications before, during, or after birth. Risk factors such as hypertensive medical conditions, maternal age, and substance use are just some of the things that can put a woman at an increased risk for developing circumvallate placenta and/or any other complications.

=== Risk factors ===
==== Hypertensive disorders ====
Women entering a pregnancy with hypertension are considered to be put at a higher risk for preeclampsia or eclampsia during the course of their pregnancy. Hypertensive disorders, like hypertension, have been found to affect about 10% of pregnancies in the United States and have resulted in about 6.8% of maternal deaths from 2011 to 2015. High blood pressure during pregnancy can potentially damage maternal organ systems such as the liver or the kidneys, which can be life-threatening. To prevent preeclampsia or eclampsia from developing in pregnancy, women with hypertension can be prescribed anti-hypertensive medications during pregnancy and are advised to monitor their blood pressure throughout the course of pregnancy.

==== Maternal age ====
Another risk factor for developing any pregnancy complications is maternal age. Advanced maternal age, considered to be when a woman enters pregnancy at age 35 or above, has also been linked to increased risk of maternal mortality, preeclampsia, restricted fetal growth, fetal distress, and a variety of other pregnancy complications. Conversely, teenage pregnancy is also associated with increased risk of endometriosis, postpartum hemorrhage, and mild preeclampsia, when compared with pregnant mothers in their 20s. Genetically, the long period of time between meiotic arrest of the egg gamete as a fetus and each ovulation cycle occurring after the onset of female puberty in teenage years can potentially contribute to the increased risk for pregnancy complications in mothers who are age 35 or older at time of pregnancy.

==== Substance use ====
Further, yet another factor inducing adverse complications in pregnancy is substance use status. Nicotine, alcohol, and marijuana are the most common substances used during pregnancies. Substance use in pregnancy is concerning because of its alarming association with other risk factors, such as mental illness. Depression alone has been associated within increased risk for preeclampsia, gestational diabetes, hypertension, premature birth, and low birth weight. Women with substance use disorders tend to live in areas that are unable to provide quality prenatal care or proper management of their psychiatric conditions. As a result of improper management of psychiatric illnesses, substances are abused during pregnancy, potentially causing harm to both the mother and the fetus. Some pregnancy complications that can occur as a result of substance use in pregnancy are fetal alcohol syndrome and neonatal abstinence disorder.

Women with these risk factors are recommended additional surveillance during pregnancy to monitor fetal development and to be able to detect fetal, placental, or umbilical cord abnormalities as early as possible.

== Pathophysiology or mechanism ==
The placenta is a transient organ developed during pregnancy that facilitates nutrient, gas, and waste exchange between a mother and a developing fetus. Placental abnormalities, such as circumvallate placenta, can harm a developing fetus, as normal exchange of materials between a mother and a developing fetus is impaired. With placental abnormalities, a developing fetus is unable to receive the vital materials that it needs for proper development, resulting in the possibility of pregnancy complications, birth defects, and/or death of the fetus.

In a normal placenta, there is a smooth transition from the parenchymal villous chorion to the membranous chorion at the border of the placental plate. Fetal blood vessels subdivide from the umbilical cord and spread diagonally throughout the parenchyma towards the edge of the placental plate.

In a circumvallate placenta, the membranes often become restrained due to marginal infarct, hemorrhage, or fibrin depositing. This results in the reduction in size of the chorionic plate of the placenta, further causing the membranes on the fetal side to fold backward on themselves. The parenchymal villous chorion continues to proliferate beyond the tethered membranes and appears to protrude outward. The fetal blood vessels are directed downward and then horizontally in order to provide blood flow to the most peripheral parts of the placental plate extending beyond the tethered membranes.

Since a portion of the placenta tends to become exposed in a circumvallate placenta, due to the reduced size of the chorionic plate, vaginal bleeding is more likely to occur at this site of exposure. Likewise, inhibited fetal growth can also ensue due to the decreased exchange of nutrients and waste between mother and fetus, since the fetus is unable to sustain necessary nutritional demands for proper fetal development. Premature rupture of membranes often occurs as a result of infection in the uterus, which can be caused by the occurrence vaginal bleeding. Therefore, placental abnormalities such as circumvallate placenta can be extremely detrimental in causing the onset of associated conditions.

== Diagnosis ==
In some cases, a physician may be able to diagnose a circumvallate placenta via ultrasound during one of many routine ultrasound screenings. In most cases, a circumvallate placenta is not discovered until physical examination of the placenta after delivery of the fetus. For this reason, circumvallate placenta is very difficult to diagnose during pregnancy.

On ultrasound, a normal placenta should appear complete and uniform, with the fetal surface of the placenta appearing slightly shiny and translucent. The appearance of a circumvallate placenta on ultrasound may present with irregular edges, uplifted margins, or placental sheets. In a study conducted in 1994, 62 healthy pregnant women were examined with placental sonography for detection of circumvallate placenta. Of the five experienced sonologists who interpreted the placental ultrasounds, all were unable to properly detect and diagnose circumvallate placenta, revealing the difficult nature of circumvallate placenta recognition. Further, these findings indicate that prenatal sonographic criteria used for detection of circumvallate placenta are not reliable enough for screening purposes.

Complete circumvallate placenta involves morphological abnormality of the entire dimension of the placenta, while partial circumvallate placenta does not involve the entire placenta but rather a portion of the placenta. Complete circumvallate placenta is very rare, occurring within about 1% of pregnancies, and has been noted to increase the risks of associated complications such as placental abruption, premature childbirth, premature rupture of membranes, perinatal death, and congenital abnormalities. Partial circumvallate placenta is more common but is not found to be as clinically significant as complete circumvallate placenta.

The accurate diagnosis of circumvallate placenta during pregnancy can have significant implications in the recognition of patients who are at risk of complications. Although the ability of sonography to accurately diagnosis circumvallate placenta during pregnancy is quite limited, research studies continue to emerge at the possibility of doing so.

== Treatment and management ==
Although there is no cure or specific treatment for restoration of the circumvallate placenta, there are ways to decrease the risks of possible complications prior to birth or attempt to manage complications if they develop. If circumvallate placenta is diagnosed during pregnancy, physicians may offer recommendations to reduce the risks of associated complications such as lower birth weight and placental abruption.

Decreased birth weight is a major concern associated with circumvallate placenta. Infants born with birth weights that are lower than expected per their gestational age oftentimes end up requiring extra support in the neonatal intensive care unit (NICU). To assist in the monitoring of appropriate fetal growth, a physician may recommend more frequent growth checks during pregnancy if circumvallate placenta is suspected. If a fetus is not growing satisfactorily, premature delivery, via vaginal delivery or caesarean section, may be recommended, with C-section being more favorable compared to vaginal delivery.

In women experiencing a placental abruption associated with circumvallate placenta, physicians will normally advocate for frequent growth checks, hospital bed rest, early delivery, and, if necessary, emergency C-section. Likewise, IV fluids and blood transfusions can also be given to patients with a placental abruption in attempts to increase blood pressure and minimize the effects of severe blood loss.

If oligohydramnios occurs as a result of a circumvallate placenta, a treatment called amnioinfusion may be considered to replenish the amount of lost amniotic fluid within the amniotic sac. Amnioinfusion may help in preventing underdevelopment of the lungs.

If diagnosed with a circumvallate placenta, consistent fetal monitoring by a licensed physician can help to prevent and/or reduce the effects of associated complications that may occur. Additionally, healthy lifestyle choices, a well-balanced and nutritious diet, adequate rest, and cessation of alcohol and tobacco products can also help to prevent the incidence of a circumvallate placenta and its associated complications. If diagnosed with a circumvallate placenta, in association with other threatening pregnancies complications, emergency cesarean section will most likely be suggested by a physician.

== Prognosis ==
Unfortunately, there is currently not a cure available for circumvallate placenta. While some evidence suggests that a circumvallate placenta can increase the risk of complication during pregnancy, other research suggests this increased risk is marginal. Sadly, circumvallate placenta can occasionally result in infant death depending on the severity of the complications encountered. In other cases, circumvallate placenta can result in premature birth of infants who are otherwise healthy after being monitored in the neonatal intensive care unit for a period of time after birth. Therefore, proper medical care and monitoring are crucial in attempting to minimize the likelihood of complications. In other cases, patients diagnosed with circumvallate placenta are able to carry their babies until term or near-term.

== Epidemiology ==
Circumvallate placenta is a very rare condition affecting pregnant women. This condition is a placental morphological abnormality, with the placenta being formed during the early periods of pregnancy. Women are able to become pregnant with the onset of ovulation and menstruation in early adolescence, with most women becoming pregnant during adulthood. Circumvallate placenta is currently known to affect about 1-2% of pregnancies. It is not virally transmissible to other individuals, nor can it be transferred through contact or respiration.

There are no specific racial or ethnic groups that are more predisposed to acquiring a circumvallate placenta during pregnancy, however, as with all pregnancies, there are general risks factors that can put a pregnant woman at risk for complications, including circumvallate placenta. Notably, certain pregnancy complications, such as preeclampsia, tend to be almost three times as fatal in African American women compared to non-Hispanic white women, even though both groups tend to experience preeclampsia at almost the same rates. This is partially thought to be due to inequalities in accessing quality prenatal care in lower socioeconomic neighborhoods and the effect of structural racism within healthcare systems. Any woman residing in an area with a lower socioeconomic status, regardless of race or age, is predisposed to developing pregnancy complications like circumvallate placenta if quality prenatal care is not available.

Women with significant obstetric histories can also be at higher risk for developing any type of pregnancy complication, including circumvallate placenta, and are recommended to be screened for placental abnormalities within their second trimester of pregnancy.

== Research ==
The placenta plays a dominant role in being responsible for a variety of complications within pregnancy and labor. Placental pathological studies have significantly contributed to recent obstetric literature. Many studies have examined the clinical significance of patients with circumvallate placenta compared to patients with a normal placenta. They have revealed that incidences of preterm birth, oligohydramnios, placental abruption, low birth weight, and fetal death were present in significantly higher rates than when compared to control patients with normal placentas.

A case study reported in 2020 observed the correlation between circumvallate placenta and the occurrence of obstetric complications such as battledore insertion. Battledore insertion, abnormal insertion of the umbilical cord into the placenta, occurs in about 7% of pregnancies and can also result in many of the same pregnancy complications as circumvallate placenta; intrauterine growth restriction, fetal distress, and fetal death. This abnormal insertion of the umbilical cord into the placenta can result in a loss of adequate blood flow to the developing fetus due to restriction. The fetus is unable to obtain normal amounts of required oxygen and nutrition through the placenta, and this can further cause other severe complications.

In the study, a 22-year-old woman at 28 weeks and 2 days of gestation, presented for a routine third trimester screening. She was noted to have had 2 prior miscarriages at 17 and 20 weeks. A previous normal second trimester routine screening at 21 weeks of gestation did not identify any structural abnormalities within the placenta, decreased fetal size, or abnormally-appearing umbilical cord insertion. The patient also did not have any episodes of vaginal bleeding during the current pregnancy.

Upon presenting for routine screening at 28 weeks and 2 days of gestation, the patient was not exhibiting any signs of active contractions and a cardiotocography was performed as part of routine screening. Cardiotocography is a diagnostic tool used during the third trimester of pregnancy to observe fetal heart rates and presence of uterine contractions. It can also be used to detect signs of any sort of fetal distress. In interpreting the cardiotocography that the 22-year-old pregnant woman had completed, it was noted that the fetus appeared to be much smaller than expected and was exhibiting concerns of decreased amniotic fluid volume, oligohydramnios, and restricted blood flow through the umbilical cord. Cardiotocographic monitoring also noted decreases in fetal heart rate every 25 minutes without contractions. Fetal motion was present, with the placenta appearing enlarged and spherical.

Decreases in the fetus' heart rate, in addition to the other findings of the cardiotocography, ultimately prompted physicians to deliver the baby via emergency cesarean section without major complications. The newborn, with normal APGAR scores and umbilical cord arterial pH levels, was admitted to the neonatal intensive care unit. Upon examining the placenta after delivery, it was noted that the placenta demonstrated the appearance of a circumvallate placenta, and also showed evidence of abnormal umbilical cord insertion into the placenta. Postpartum, the mother had a good recovery and the newborn was discharged from the neonatal intensive care unit 105 days post-birth.

This case study discussed the association of circumvallate placenta and abnormal battledore cord insertion in producing pregnancy complications. Restriction of umbilical cord blood flow from the placenta to the fetus and placental abnormalities like circumvallate placenta may work in conjunction to generate fetal distress. Decreased levels of oxygenation and nutrient absorption resulted in decelerations of fetal heart rate and the decision to deliver the fetus via cesarean section to prevent fetal death by hypoxia. Routine monitoring of fetal growth and development, placental structure, and placental function are recommended with high-risk pregnancies. In patients diagnosed with circumvallate placenta during pregnancy, monthly fetal growth assessments are also recommended. Patients found to have blood flow restrictions to or from the placenta are recommended to undergo weekly ultrasounds with consistent monitoring of fetal heart rate.

In a separate case study reported in 2017, a woman at about 35 weeks of gestation presented with preeclampsia and intrauterine fetal demise, or more commonly known as stillbirth. After delivery of the stillborn fetus, examination of the placenta revealed a circumvallate placenta with battledore insertion of the umbilical cord. It was speculated that the combination of circumvallate placenta and battledore insertion had led to the loss of the fetus prior to delivery, as there was no other discernible cause for the stillbirth. While circumvallate placenta and battledore insertion are individually very rare conditions that can result in multiple pregnancy complications, the coexistence of these abnormalities likely resulted in the loss of the fetus. The diminished blood flow and circulation from the placenta to the fetus, as caused by battledore insertion, in combination with the impaired exchange of nutrients and wastes between mother and fetus, as caused by circumvallate placenta, likely contributed to the preeclampsia and this loss of fetal life.

Thus, it is highly recommended that if placental or umbilical cord abnormalities, such as circumvallate placental and battledore insertion, are suspected or detected prior to birth, that the pregnancy should be considered high-risk. High-risk pregnancies significantly benefit from frequent follow-ups using ultrasonography to monitor fetal developmental and placental and umbilical cord structure and function.

Research directions continue to investigate methods in which circumvallate placenta may be more commonly diagnosed during pregnancy before complications can transpire. Biomarkers such as Sflt/PlGF can be used to predict severe pregnancy complications in high-risk pregnancies. Circumvallate placenta appears to be correlated with reduced placental efficacy due to increased placental thickness and abnormal villi function, affecting the Sflt/PlGF ratio. It is thought that obtaining Sflt/PlGF ratios can be used to determine deficiencies in placental function in cases of placental abnormalities. Future research analyzing the contribution of biomarkers like Sflt/PlGF to predict placental abnormalities would be influential to our understanding of many placental deformities, including circumvallate placenta.

Due to the rare occurrences of circumvallate placenta, more extensive research trials are unavailable, resulting in data limitations. Therefore, the clinical importance of circumvallate placenta remains uncertain.
