= Placental insufficiency =

Failure of the placenta to deliver sufficient nutrients to the fetus during pregnancy

- Other names: Utero-placental insufficiency
- Specialty: Neonatology, obstetrics, maternal–fetal medicine
- Frequency: 0.03%

Placental insufficiency or utero-placental insufficiency is the failure of the placenta to deliver sufficient nutrients to the fetus during pregnancy, and is often a result of insufficient blood flow to the placenta. The term is also sometimes used to designate late decelerations of fetal heart rate as measured by cardiotocography or an NST, even if there is no other evidence of reduced blood flow to the placenta, normal uterine blood flow rate being 600mL/min.

== Causes ==
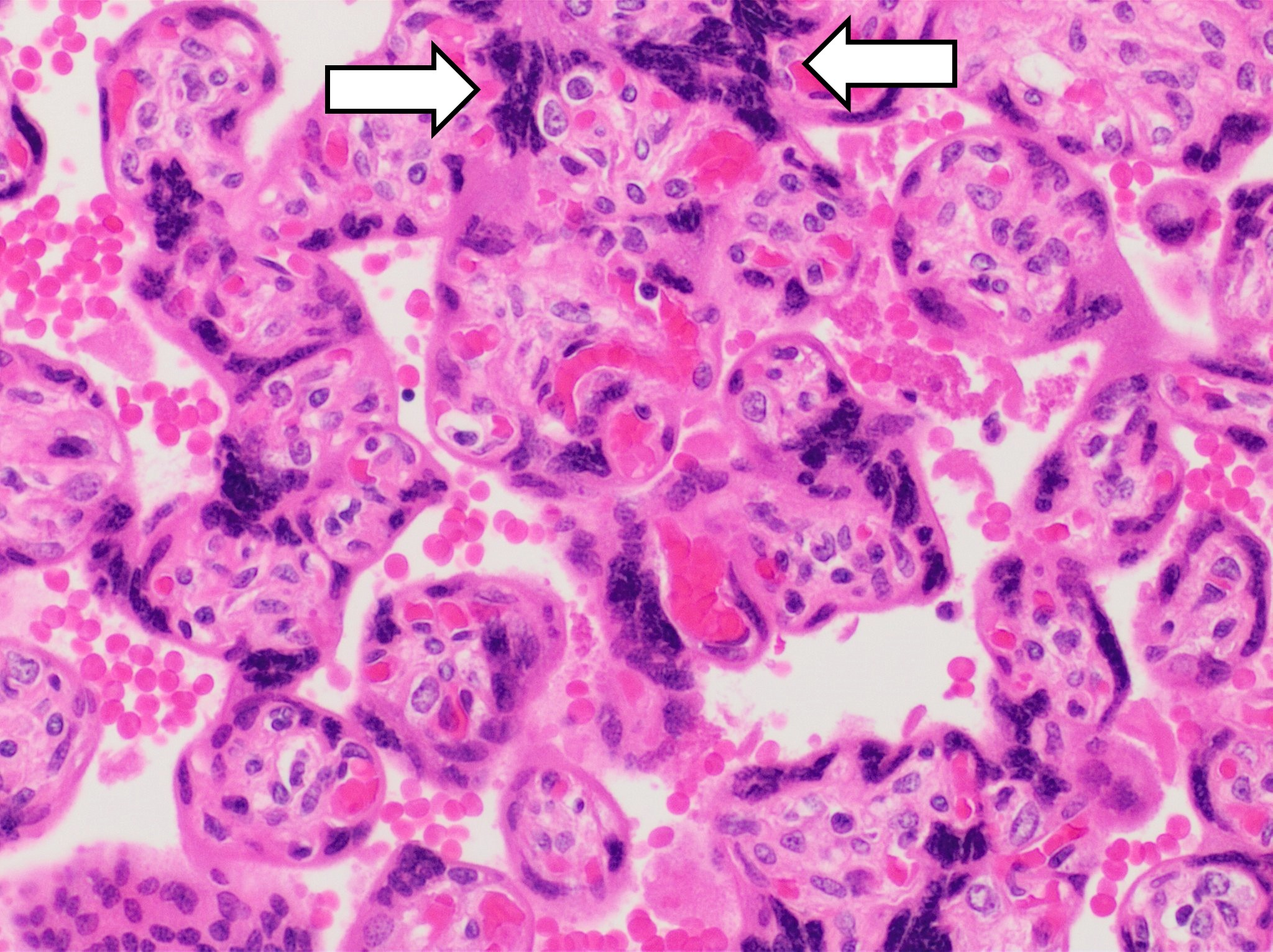
Histopathology of placenta with increased syncytial knotting of chorionic villi, with two knots pointed out.

The following characteristics of placentas have been said to be associated with placental insufficiency, however all of them occur in normal healthy placentas and full term healthy births, so none of them can be used to accurately diagnose placental insufficiency:

- Abnormally thin placenta (less than 1 cm)
- Circumvallate placenta (1% of normal placentas)
- Amnion cell metaplasia, (amnion nodosum) (present in 65% of normal placentas)
- Increased syncytial knots
- Calcifications
- Infarcts due to focal or diffuse thickening of blood vessels
- Villi capillaries occupying about 50% of the villi volume or when <40% of capillaries are on the villous periphery

Placental insufficiency should not be confused with complete placental abruption, in which the placenta separates off the uterine wall, which immediately results in no blood flow to the placenta, which leads to immediate fetal demise. In the case of a marginal, incomplete placental abruption of less than 50%, usually weeks of hospitalization precedes delivery and outcomes are not necessarily affected by the partial abruption.

== Pathophysiology ==
=== Maternal effects ===
Several aspects of maternal adaptation to pregnancy are affected by dysfunction of placenta. Maternal arteries fail to transform into low-resistance vessels (expected by 22–24 weeks of gestation). This increases vascular resistance in the fetoplacental vascular bed, eventually leading to reduction in metabolically active mass of placenta in a type of vicious cycle.

=== Fetal effects ===
Placental insufficiency can affect the fetus, causing fetal distress. Placental insufficiency may cause oligohydramnios, preeclampsia, miscarriage or stillbirth. Placental insufficiency is most frequent cause of asymmetric IUGR.

==== Fetal metabolic changes ====
Metabolic changes occurring in uteroplacental insufficiency:

Substrate	Change
Glucose	Decreases in proportion to degree of fetal hypoglycemia
Amino acids	Decrease in branched chain amino acids (valine, leucine, isoleucine), serine and lysine.; Increase in hydroxyproline; Glycine:Valine ratio increases in amniotic fluid; Increase in ammonia in amniotic fluid (positive correlation with ponderal index)
Fatty acids	Decrease in long-chain polyunsaturated fatty acids; Decrease in overall fatty acid transport via umbilical cord
Oxygen and Carbon dioxide	Degree of hypoxemia is proportional to villous damage; Hypercapnia, acidemia, hypoxemia and hyperlacticemia in proportion to hypoxemia

==== Fetal hormonal changes ====
Decrease in overall thyroid function is correlated with fetal hypoxemia. Serum glucagon, adrenaline, noradrenaline levels increase, eventually causing peripheral glycogenolysis and mobilization of fetal hepatic glycogen stores.

==== Fetal hematologic changes ====
Fetal hypoxemia triggers erythropoietin release. This stimulates RBC production from medullary and extramedullary sites and eventually results in polycythemia. Oxygen carrying capacity of blood is thus increased. Prolonged tissue hypoxemia may cause early release of erythrocytes from maturation sites and thus count of nucleated RBCs in blood increases. These factors, increase in blood viscosity, decrease in cell membrane fluidity and platelet aggregation are important precursors in accelerating placental vascular occlusion.

==== Fetal immunological changes ====
There is decrease in immunoglobulin, absolute B-cell counts and total WBC count. T-helper and cytotoxic T-cells are suppressed in proportion of degree of acidemia. These conditions lead to higher infection susceptibility of infant after delivery.

==== Fetal cardiovascular changes ====
There is decrease in magnitude of umbilical venous volume flow. In response to this, the proportion of umbilical venous blood diverted to fetal heart increases. This eventually leads to elevation of pulmonary vascular resistance and increased right ventricular afterload. This fetal cerebral redistribution of blood flow is an early response to placental insufficiency. Blood flow is selectively redirected to the myocardium, adrenal glands, and in particular to the brain in a brain-sparing effect.

In late stage, the redistribution becomes ineffective, there is decrease in cardiac output, ineffective preload handling and elevation of central venous pressure. This deterioration in circulation may ultimately lead to tricuspid insufficiency and death of the fetus. Peripheral circulatory disturbances also accompany these central circulatory changes.

==== Fetal behavioral changes ====
Chronic hypoxemia leads to delay in all aspects of CNS maturation. With worsening fetal hypoxemia, there is decline in fetal activity. With further hypoxemia, fetal breathing ceases. Gross body movements and tone decrease further. Fetal heart rate decreases due to spontaneous deceleration due to direct depression of cardiac contractility. This leads to intrauterine fetal death.

==== Risk of later metabolic disease ====
According to the theory of thrifty phenotype, placental insufficiency triggers epigenetic responses in the fetus that are otherwise activated in times of chronic food shortage. If the offspring actually develops in an environment rich in food it may be more prone to metabolic disorders, such as obesity and type II diabetes.

== Diagnosis ==
The following tests have been promoted as supposedly diagnosing placental insufficiency, but all have been unsuccessful at predicting stillbirth due to placental insufficiency:

- Placental grading
- Amniotic fluid index
- Fetal biophysical profile test scoring
- Doppler velocimetry
- Routine ultrasound scanning
- Detection and management of maternal diabetes mellitus
- Antenatal fetal heart rate monitoring using cardiotocography
- Vibroacoustic stimulation, fetal movement counting
- Home vs. hospital-based bed rest and monitoring in high-risk pregnancy
- In-hospital fetal surveillance unit
- Use of the partograph during labor
- Cardiotocography during labor with or without pulse oximetry

== See also ==
- Small for gestational age
