= Nana Travoada =

São Tomé and Príncipe first lady

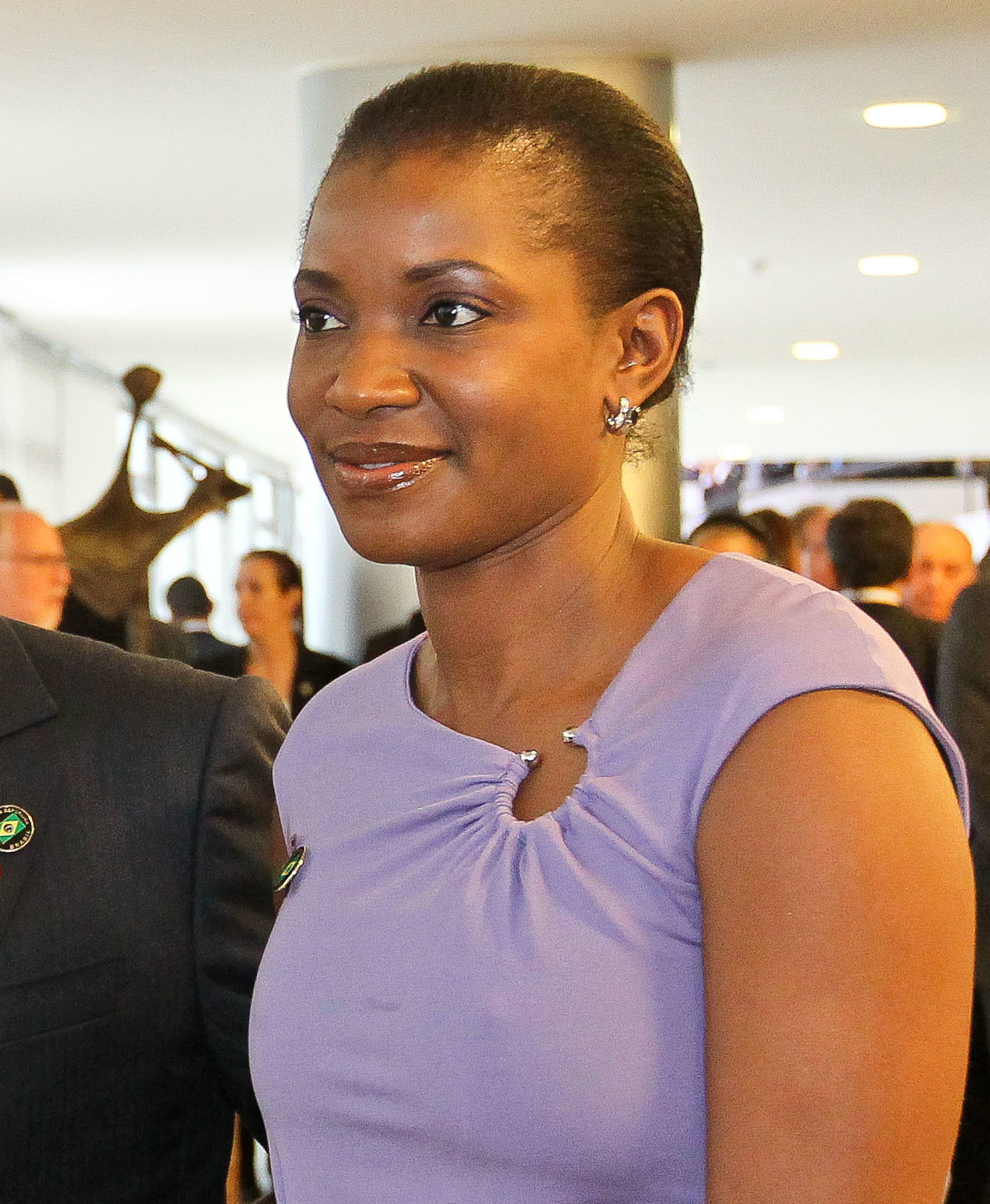
Travoada in 2011

Nana Trovoada is a São Toméan public figure and the wife of the Prime Minister of the central African country of the Democratic republic of São Tomé and Príncipe.

== Biography ==
Nana Travoada is the prime minister's wife of the Democratic republic of São Tomé and Príncipe and wife of Prime Minister Patrice Trovoada, fifteenth Prime Minister of the republic of São Tomé and Príncipe. Nana Travoada has been an advocate for empowerment of the youth. She was part of the forum at the 2017 Transform Africa Summit in Uganda that discussed the use of technology and Smart Health Opportunities to curtail healthcare challenges in Africa.

Nana Travoada has also been active in the space of advocating for expanding the provision of health services to mostly rural communities in accordance with the Ouagadougou Declaration on Primary Health Care for all. She was a delegate of the 2010 African Vision Initiative held in Bamako and attended by Spouses of the African Heads of State to address the challenges of maternal and neonatal mortality in the countries of Africa.
