= Lamina basalis =

Lamina basalis can refer to:

- Basal lamina (extracellular matrix layer)
- Basal plate (placenta)
- Basal plate (neural tube)
- Bruch's membrane (lamina basalis choroideae)
