= Meconium aspiration syndrome =

Medical condition affecting newborn infants

- Other names: Neonatal aspiration of meconium
- X-ray showing the extent of lung epithelial damage in response to meconium seen in neonates with meconium aspiration syndrome.
- Specialty: Neonatology

Meconium aspiration syndrome (MAS), also known as neonatal aspiration of meconium, is a medical condition affecting newborn infants. It describes the spectrum of disorders and pathophysiology of newborns born in meconium-stained amniotic fluid (MSAF) and have meconium within their lungs. Therefore, MAS has a wide range of severity depending on what conditions and complications develop after parturition. Furthermore, the pathophysiology of MAS is multifactorial and extremely complex which is why it is the leading cause of morbidity and mortality in term infants.

The word meconium is derived from the Greek word mēkōnion meaning juice from the opium poppy as the sedative effects it had on the foetus were observed by Aristotle.

Meconium is a sticky dark-green substance which contains gastrointestinal secretions, amniotic fluid, bile acids, bile, blood, mucus, cholesterol, pancreatic secretions, lanugo, vernix caseosa and cellular debris. Meconium accumulates in the foetal gastrointestinal tract throughout the third trimester of pregnancy and it is the first intestinal discharge released within the first 48 hours after birth. Notably, since meconium and the whole content of the gastrointestinal tract is located 'extracorporeally,' its constituents are hidden and normally not recognised by the foetal immune system.

For the meconium within the amniotic fluid to successfully cause MAS, it has to enter the respiratory system during the period when the fluid-filled lungs transition into an air-filled organ capable of gas exchange.

== Causes ==
The main theories of meconium passage into amniotic fluid are caused by fetal maturity or from foetal stress as a result of hypoxia or infection. Other factors that promote the passage of meconium in utero include placental insufficiency, maternal hypertension, pre-eclampsia and maternal drug use of tobacco and cocaine. However, the exact mechanism for meconium passage into the amniotic fluid is not completely understood and it may be a combination of several factors.

=== Meconium passage as a result of foetal distress ===
There may be an important association between foetal distress and hypoxia with MSAF. It is believed that foetal distress develops into foetal hypoxia causing the foetus to defecate meconium resulting in MSAF and then perhaps MAS. Other stressors which causes foetal distress, and therefore meconium passage, includes when umbilical vein oxygen saturation is below 30%.

Foetal hypoxic stress during parturition can stimulate colonic activity, by enhancing intestinal peristalsis and relaxing the anal sphincter, which results in the passage of meconium. Then, because of intrauterine gasping or from the first few breaths after delivery, MAS may develop. Furthermore, aspiration of thick meconium leads to obstruction of airways resulting in a more severe hypoxia.

The association between foetal distress and meconium passage is not a definite cause-effect relationship as over 3/4 of infants with MSAF are vigorous at birth and do not have any distress or hypoxia. Additionally, foetal distress occurs frequently without the passage of meconium as well.

=== Meconium passage as a result of foetal maturity ===
Although meconium is present in the gastrointestinal tract early in development, MSAF rarely occurs before 34 weeks gestation.

Peristalsis of the foetal intestines is present as early as 8 weeks gestation and the anal sphincter develops at about 20–22 weeks. The early control mechanisms of the anal sphincter are not well understood, however there is evidence that the foetus does defecate routinely into the amniotic cavity even in the absence of distress. The presence of fetal intestinal enzymes have been found in the amniotic fluid of women who are as early as 14–22 weeks pregnant. Thus, suggesting there is free passage of the intestinal contents into the amniotic fluid.

Motilin is found in higher concentrations in post-term than pre-term foetal gastrointestinal tracts. Similarly, intestinal parasympathetic innervation and myelination also increases in later gestations. Therefore, the increased incidence of MAS in post-term pregnancies may reflect the maturation and development of the peristalsis within the gastrointestinal tract in the newborn.

== Pathophysiology ==
As MAS describes a spectrum of disorders of newborns born through MSAF, without any congenital respiratory disorders or other underlying pathology, there are numerous hypothesised mechanisms and causes for the onset of this syndrome. Long-term consequences may arise from these disorders, for example, infants that develop MAS have higher rates of developing neurodevelopmental defects due to poor respiration.

=== Airway obstruction ===
In the first 15 minutes of meconium aspiration, there is obstruction of larger airways which causes increased lung resistance, decreased lung compliance, acute hypoxemia, hypercapnia, atelectasis and respiratory acidosis. After 60 minutes of exposure, the meconium travels further down into the smaller airways. Once within the terminal bronchioles and alveoli, the meconium triggers inflammation, pulmonary edema, vasoconstriction, bronchoconstriction, collapse of airways and inactivation of surfactant.

=== Foetal hypoxia ===
The lung areas which do not or only partially participate in ventilation, because of obstruction and/or destruction, will become hypoxic and an inflammatory response may consequently occur. Partial obstruction will lead to air trapping and hyperinflation of certain lung areas and pneumothorax may follow. Chronic hypoxia will lead to an increase in pulmonary vascular smooth muscle tone and persistent pulmonary hypertension causing respiratory and circulatory failure.

=== Infection ===
Microorganisms, most commonly Gram-negative rods, and endotoxins are found in samples of MSAF at a higher rate than in clear amniotic fluid, for example 46.9% of patients with MSAF also had endotoxins present. A microbial invasion of the amniotic cavity (MIAC) is more common in patients with MSAF and this could ultimately lead to an intra-amniotic inflammatory response. MIAC is associated with high concentrations of cytokines (such as IL-6), chemokines (such as IL-8 and monocyte chemoattractant protein-1), complement, phospholipase A_{2} and matrix-degrading enzymes. Therefore, these aforementioned mediators within the amniotic fluid during MIAC and intra-amniotic infection could, when aspirated in utero, induce lung inflammation within the foetus.

=== Pulmonary inflammation ===
Meconium has a complex chemical composition, so it is difficult to identify a single agent responsible for the several diseases that arise. As meconium is stored inside the intestines, and is partly unexposed to the immune system, when it becomes aspirated the innate immune system recognises as a foreign and dangerous substance. The immune system, which is present at birth, responds within minutes with a low specificity and no memory in order to try to eliminate microbes. Meconium perhaps leads to chemical pneumonitis as it is a potent activator of inflammatory mediators which include cytokines, complement, prostaglandins and reactive oxygen species.

Meconium is a source of pro-inflammatory cytokines, including tumour necrosis factor (TNF) and interleukins (IL-1, IL-6, IL-8), and mediators produced by neutrophils, macrophages and epithelial cells that may injure the lung tissue directly or indirectly. For example, proteolytic enzymes are released from neutrophilic granules and these may damage the lung membrane and surfactant proteins. Additionally, activated leukocytes and cytokines generate reactive nitrogen and oxygen species which have cytotoxic effects. Oxidative stress results in vasoconstriction, bronchoconstriction, platelet aggregation and accelerated cellular apoptosis. Recently, it has been hypothesised that meconium is a potent activator of toll-like receptor (TLRs) and complement, key mediators in inflammation, and may thus contribute to the inflammatory response in MAS.

Meconium contains high amounts of phospholipase A_{2} (PLA_{2}), a potent proinflammatory enzyme, which may directly (or through the stimulation of arachidonic acid) lead to surfactant dysfunction, lung epithelium destruction, tissue necrosis and an increase in apoptosis. Meconium can also activate the coagulation cascade, production of platelet-activating factor (PAF) and other vasoactive substances that may lead to destruction of capillary endothelium and basement membranes. Injury to the alveolocapillary membrane results in leakage of liquid, plasma proteins, and cells into the interstitium and alveolar spaces.

=== Surfactant inactivation ===
Surfactant is synthesised by type II alveolar cells and is made of a complex of phospholipids, proteins and saccharides. It functions to lower surface tension (to allow for lung expansion during inspiration), stabilise alveoli at the end of expiration (to prevent alveolar collapse) and prevents lung oedema. Surfactant also contributes to lung protection and defence as it is also an anti-inflammatory agent. Surfactant enhances the removal of inhaled particles and senescent cells away from the alveolar structure.

The extent of surfactant inhibition depends on both the concentration of surfactant and meconium. If the surfactant concentration is low, even very highly diluted meconium can inhibit surfactant function whereas, in high surfactant concentrations, the effects of meconium are limited. Meconium may impact surfactant mechanisms by preventing surfactant from spreading over the alveolar surface, decreasing the concentration of surfactant proteins (SP-A and SP-B), and by changing the viscosity and structure of surfactant. Several morphological changes occur after meconium exposure, the most notable being the detachment of airway epithelium from stroma and the shedding of epithelial cells into the airway. These indicate a direct detrimental effect on lung alveolar cells because of the introduction of meconium into the lungs.

=== Persistent Pulmonary Hypertension ===
Persistent pulmonary hypertension (PPHN) is the failure of the foetal circulation to adapt to extra-uterine conditions after birth. PPHN is associated with various respiratory diseases, including MAS (as 15-20% of infants with MAS develop PPHN), but also pneumonia and sepsis. A combination of hypoxia, pulmonary vasoconstriction and ventilation/perfusion mismatch can trigger PPHN, depending on the concentration of meconium within the respiratory tract. PPHN in newborns is the leading cause of death in MAS.

=== Apoptosis ===
Apoptosis is an important mechanism in the clearance of injured cells and in tissue repair, however too much apoptosis may cause harm, such as acute lung injury. Meconium induces apoptosis and DNA cleavage of lung airway epithelial cells, this is detected by the presence of fragmented DNA within the airways and in alveolar epithelial nuclei. Meconium induces an inflammatory reaction within the lungs as there is an increase of autophagocytic cells and levels of caspase 3 after exposure. After 8 hours of meconium exposure, in rabbit foetuses, the total amount of apoptotic cells is 54%. Therefore, the majority of meconium-induced lung damage may be due to the apoptosis of lung epithelium.

== Diagnosis ==
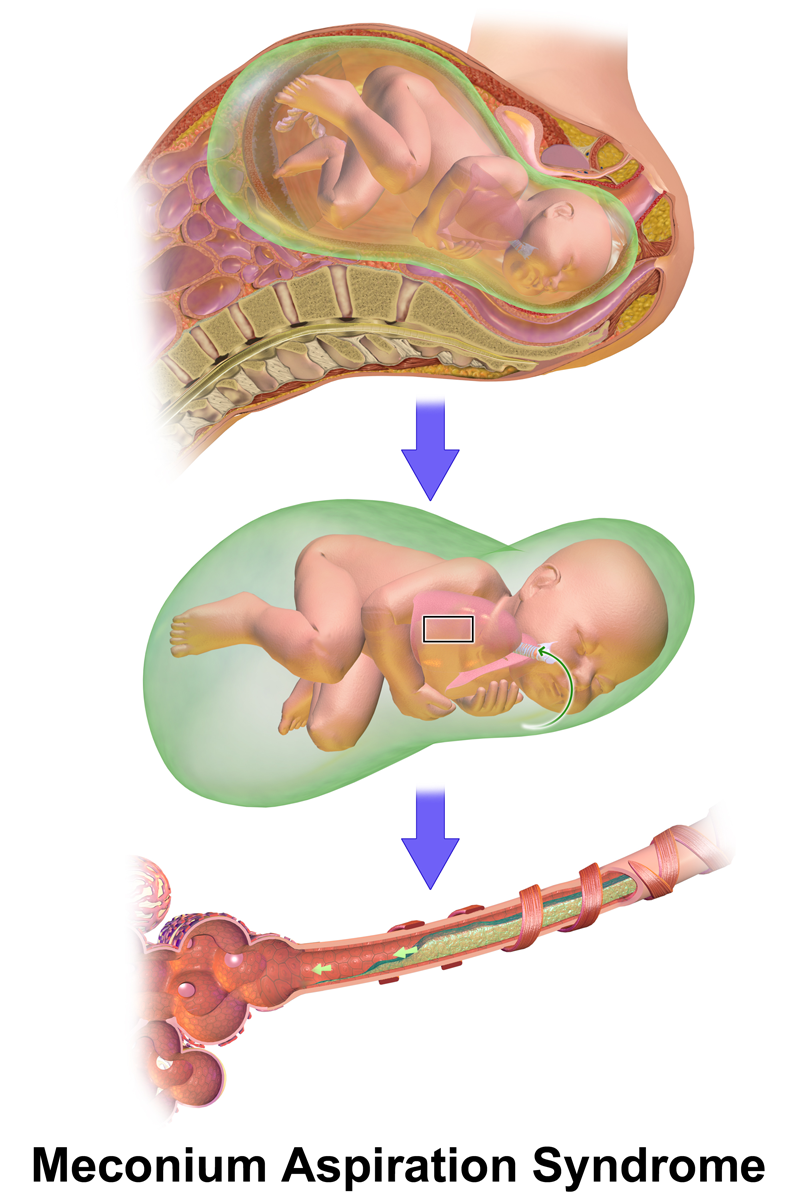
Release of meconium into the amniotic cavity and then intrauterine gasping of post-term neonates may cause meconium aspiration syndrome.

Respiratory distress in an infant born through the darkly coloured MSAF as well as meconium obstructing the airways is usually sufficient to diagnose MAS. Additionally, newborns with MAS can have other types of respiratory distress such as tachypnea and hypercapnia. Sometimes it is hard to diagnose MAS as it can be confused with other diseases that also cause respiratory distress, such as pneumonia. Additionally, X-rays and lung ultrasounds can be quick, easy and cheap imaging techniques to diagnose lung diseases like MAS.

== Prevention ==
In general, the incidence of MAS has been significantly reduced over the past two decades as the number of post-term deliveries has minimized.

=== Prevention during pregnancy ===
Prevention during pregnancy may include amnioinfusion and antibiotics but the effectiveness of these treatments are questionable.

=== Prevention during parturition ===
As previously mentioned, oropharyngeal and nasopharyngeal suctioning is not an ideal preventative treatment for both vigorous and depressed (not breathing) infants.

== Treatment ==
Most infants born through MSAF do not require any treatments (other than routine postnatal care) as they show no signs of respiratory distress, as only approximately 5% of infants born through MSAF develop MAS. However, infants which do develop MAS need to be admitted to a neonatal unit where they will be closely observed and provided any treatments needed. Observations include monitoring heart rate, respiratory rate, oxygen saturation and blood glucose (to detect worsening respiratory acidosis or the development of hypoglycemia). In general, treatment of MAS is more supportive in nature.

=== Assisted ventilation techniques ===
To clear the airways of meconium, tracheal suctioning can be used however, the efficacy of this method is in question and it can cause harm.

In cases of MAS, there is a need for supplemental oxygen for at least 12 hours in order to maintain oxygen saturation of haemoglobin at 92% or more. The severity of respiratory distress can vary significantly between newborns with MAS, as some require minimal or no supplemental oxygen requirement and, in severe cases, mechanical ventilation may be needed. The desired oxygen saturation is between 90 and 95% and PaO_{2} may be as high as 90mmHg. In cases where there is thick meconium deep within the lungs, mechanical ventilation may be required. In extreme cases, extracorporeal membrane oxygenation (ECMO) may be utilised in infants who fail to respond to ventilation therapy. While on ECMO, the body can have time to absorb the meconium and for all the associated disorders to resolve. There has been an excellent response to this treatment, as the survival rate of MAS while on ECMO is more than 94%.

Ventilation of infants with MAS can be challenging and, as MAS can affect each individual differently, ventilation administration may need to be customised. Some newborns with MAS can have homogenous lung changes and others can have inconsistent and patchy changes to their lungs. It is common for sedation and muscle relaxants to be used to optimise ventilation and minimise the risk of pneumothorax associated with dyssynchronous breathing.

=== Inhaled nitric oxide ===
Inhaled nitric oxide (iNO) acts on vascular smooth muscle causing selective pulmonary vasodilation. This is ideal in the treatment of PPHN as it causes vasodilation within ventilated areas of the lung thus, decreasing the ventilation-perfusion mismatch and thereby, improves oxygenation. Treatment utilising iNO decreases the need for ECMO and mortality in newborns with hypoxic respiratory failure and PPHN as a result of MAS. However, approximately 30-50% of infants with PPHN do not respond to iNO therapy.

=== Antiinflammatories ===
As inflammation is such a huge issue in MAS, treatment has consisted of anti-inflammatories.

==== Glucocorticoids ====
Glucocorticoids have a strong anti-inflammatory activity and works to reduce the migration and activation of neutrophils, eosinophils, mononuclear cells, and other cells. They reduce the migration of neutrophils into the lungs ergo, decreasing their adherence to the endothelium. Thus, there is a reduction in the action of mediators released from these cells and therefore, a reduced inflammatory response.

Glucocorticoids also possess a genomic mechanism of action in which, once bound to a glucocorticoid receptor, the activated complex moves into the nucleus and inhibits transcription of mRNA. Ultimately, effecting whether various proteins get produced or not. Inhibiting the transcription of nuclear factor (NF-κB) and protein activator (AP-1) attenuates the expression of pro-inflammatory cytokines (IL-1, IL-6, IL-8 and TNF etc.), enzymes (PLA_{2}, COX-2, iNOs etc.) and other biologically active substances. The anti-inflammatory effect of glucocorticoids is also demonstrated by enhancing the activity of lipocortines which inhibit the activity of PLA_{2} and therefore, decrease the production of arachidonic acid and mediators of lipoxygenase and cyclooxygenase pathways.

Anti-inflammatories need to be administered as quickly as possible as the effect of these drugs can diminish even just an hour after meconium aspiration. For example, early administration of dexamethasone significantly enhanced gas exchange, reduced ventilatory pressures, decreased the number of neutrophils in the bronchoalveolar area, reduced oedema formation and oxidative lung injury. However, glucocorticoids may increase the risk of infection and this risk increases with the dose and duration of glucocorticoid treatment. Other issues can arise, such as aggravation of diabetes mellitus, osteoporosis, skin atrophy and growth retardation in children.

==== Inhibitors of phosphodiesterase ====
Phosphodiesterases (PDE) degrades cAMP and cGMP and, within the respiratory system of a newborn with MAS, various isoforms of PDE may be involved due to their pro-inflammatory and smooth muscle contractile activity. Therefore, non-selective and selective inhibitors of PDE could potentially be used in MAS therapy. However, the use of PDE inhibitors can cause cardiovascular side effects. Non-selective PDE inhibitors, such as methylxanthines, increase concentrations of cAMP and cGMP in the cells leading to bronchodilation and vasodilation. Additionally, methylxanthines decreases the concentrations of calcium, acetylcholine and monoamines, this controls the release of various mediators of inflammation and bronchoconstriction, including prostaglandins. Selective PDE inhibitors target one subtype of phosphodiesterase and in MAS the activities of PDE-3, PDE-4, PDE-5 and PDE-7 may become enhanced. For example, Milrinone (a selective PDE3 inhibitor) improved oxygenation and survival of neonates with MAS.

==== Inhibitors of cyclooxygenase ====
Arachidonic acid is metabolised, via cyclooxygenase (COX) and lipoxygenase, to various substances including prostaglandins and leukotrienes, which exhibit potent pro-inflammatory and vasoactive effects. By inhibiting COX, and more specifically COX-2, (either through selective or non-selective drugs) inflammation and oedema can be reduced. However, COX inhibitors may induce peptic ulcers and cause hyperkalemia and hypernatremia. Additionally, COX inhibitors have not shown any great response in the treatment of MAS.

=== Antibiotics ===
Meconium is typically sterile however, it can contain various cultures of bacteria so appropriate antibiotics may need to be prescribed.

=== Surfactant treatment ===
Lung lavage with diluted surfactant has potential benefits depending on how early it is given in newborns with MAS. This treatment shows promise as it has an effect on air leaks, pneumothorax, the need for ECMO and death. Early intervention and using it on newborns with mild MAS is more effective. However, there are risks as a large volume of fluid instillation to the lung of a newborn can be dangerous (particularly in cases of severe MAS with pulmonary hypertension) as it can exacerbate hypoxia and lead to mortality.

=== Previous treatments ===
Originally, it was believed that MAS developed as a result of the meconium being a physical blockage of the airways. Thus, to prevent newborns, who were born through MSAF, from developing MAS, suctioning of the oropharyngeal and nasopharyngeal area before delivery of the shoulders followed by tracheal aspiration was utilised for 20 years. This treatment was believed to be effective as it was reported to significantly decrease the incidence of MAS compared to those newborns born through MSAF who were not treated. This claim was later disproved and future studies concluded that oropharyngeal and nasopharyngeal suctioning, before delivery of the shoulders in infants born through MSAF, does not prevent MAS or its complications. In fact, it can cause more issues and damage (e.g. mucosal damage), thus it is not a recommended preventative treatment. Suctioning may not significantly reduce the incidence of MAS as meconium passage and aspiration may occur in-utero. Thereby making the suctioning redundant and useless as the meconium may already be deep within the lungs at the time of birth.

Historically, amnioinfusion has been used when MSAF was present, which involves a transcervical infusion of fluid during labour. The idea was to dilute the thick meconium to reduce its potential pathophysiology and reduce cases of MAS, since MAS is more prevalent in cases of thick meconium. However, there are associated risks, such as umbilical cord prolapse and prolongation of labour. The UK National Institute of Health and Clinical Excellence (NICE) Guidelines recommend against the use of amnioinfusion in women with MSAF.

== Prevalence ==
1 in every 7 pregnancies have MSAF and, of these cases, approximately 5% of these infants develop MAS. MSAF is observed 23-52% in pregnancies at 42 weeks. Therefore, the frequency of MAS increases as the length of gestation increases, such that the prevalence is greatest in post-term pregnancies. Conversely, preterm births are not frequently associated with MSAF (only approximately 5% in total contain MSAF). The rate of MAS declines in populations where labour is induced in women that have pregnancies exceeding 41 weeks. There are many suspected pre-disposing factors that are thought to increase the risk of MAS. For example, the risk of MSAF is higher in African American, African and Pacific Islander mothers, compared to mothers from other ethnic groups.

== Future research ==
Research is being focused on developing both a successful method for preventing MAS as well as an effective treatment. For example, investigations are being made in the efficiency of anti-inflammatory agents, surfactant replacement therapy and antibiotic therapy. More research needs to be conducted on the pharmacological properties of, for example, glucocorticoids, including dosages, administration, timing or any drug interactions. Additionally, there is still research being conducted on whether intubation and suctioning of meconium in newborns with MAS is beneficial, harmful or is simply a redundant and outdated treatment. In general, there is still no generally accepted therapeutic protocol and effective treatment plan for MAS.

== See also ==
- Aspiration pneumonia
