= Foetal cerebral redistribution =

Diagnosis in foetal medicine

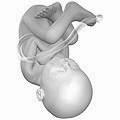
Artist's depiction of a foetus at 38 weeks' gestation

Foetal cerebral redistribution or 'brain-sparing' is a diagnosis in foetal medicine. It is characterised by preferential flow of blood towards the brain at the expense of the other vital organs, and it occurs as a haemodynamic adaptation in foetuses which have placental insufficiency. The underlying mechanism is thought to be vasodilation of the cerebral arteries. Cerebral redistribution is defined by the presence of a low middle cerebral artery pulsatility index (MCA-PI). Ultrasound of the middle cerebral artery to examine the Doppler waveform is used to establish this. Although cerebral redistribution represents an effort to preserve brain development in the face of hypoxic stress, it is nonetheless associated with adverse neurodevelopmental outcome. The presence of cerebral redistribution will be one factor taken into consideration when deciding whether to artificially deliver a baby with placental insufficiency via induction of labour or caesarian section.

== Additional images ==
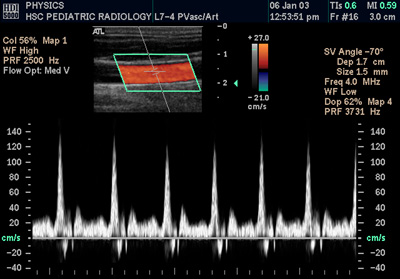
An example of the use of Doppler ultrasound to examine the waveform within an artery; this technique is applied to the middle cerebral artery to diagnose cerebral redistribution
