= Fetal distress =

Paediatric and children's diseases

Fetal distress, also known as non-reassuring fetal status, is a condition during pregnancy or labor in which the fetus shows signs of inadequate oxygenation. Due to its imprecision, the term "fetal distress" has fallen out of use in American obstetrics. The term "non-reassuring fetal status" has largely replaced it. It is characterized by changes in fetal movement, growth, heart rate, and presence of meconium stained fluid.

Risk factors for fetal distress/non-reassuring fetal status include anemia, restriction of fetal growth, maternal hypertension or cardiovascular disease, low amniotic fluid or meconium in the amniotic fluid, or a post-term pregnancy. The condition is detected most often with electronic fetal heart rate (FHR) monitoring through cardiotocography (CTG), which allows clinicians to measure changes in the fetal cardiac response to declining oxygen. Specifically, heart rate decelerations detected on CTG can represent danger to the fetus and to delivery.

Treatment primarily consists of intrauterine resuscitation, the goal of which is to restore oxygenation of the fetus. This can involve improving the position, hydration, and oxygenation of the mother, as well as amnioinfusion to restore sufficient amniotic fluid, delaying preterm labor contractions with tocolysis, and correction of fetal acid-base balance. An algorithm is used to treat/resuscitate babies in need of respiratory support post-birth.

== Signs and symptoms ==
Generally, it is preferable to describe specific signs in lieu of declaring fetal distress that include:

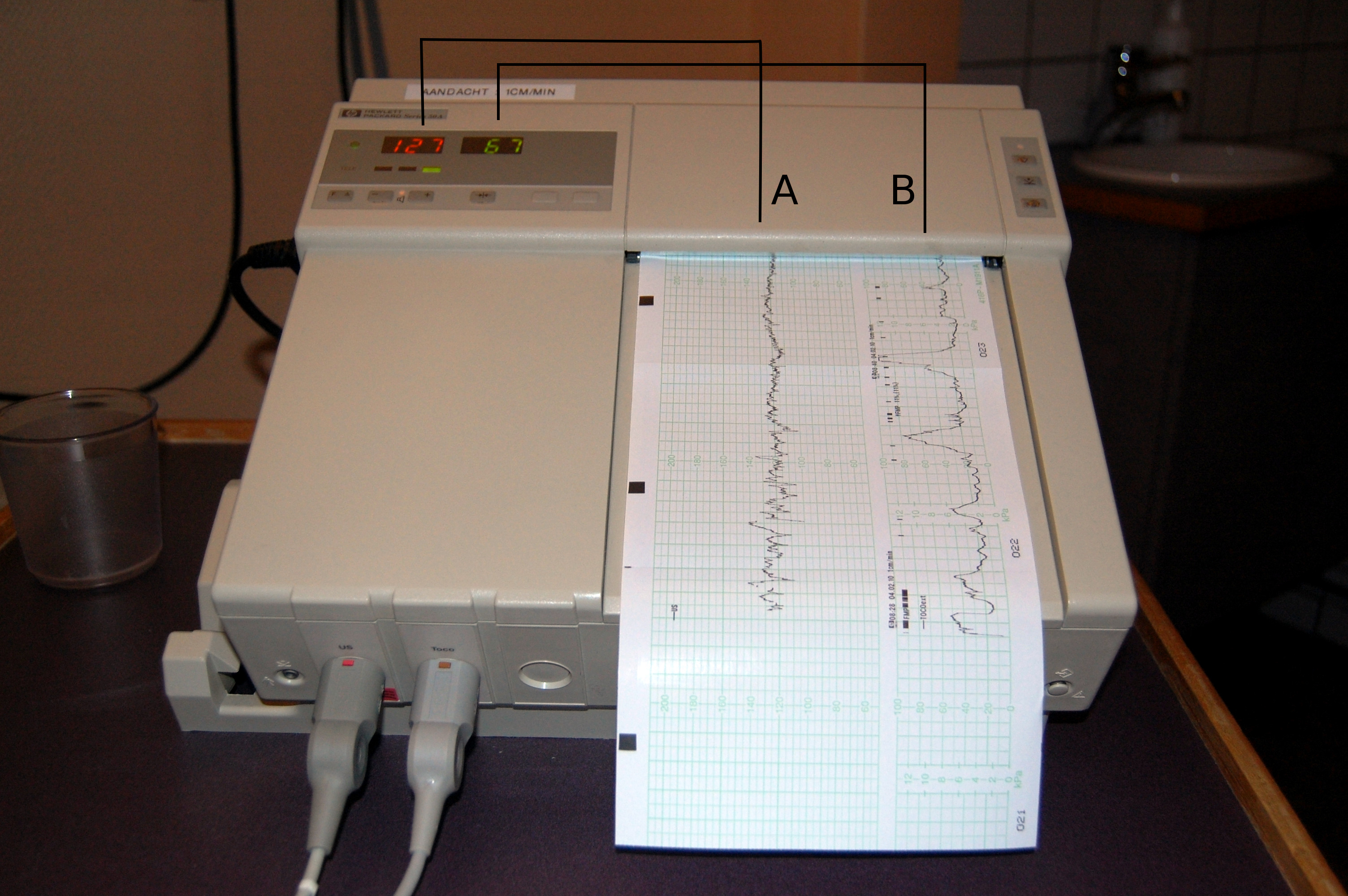
Cardiotocography is used to monitor fetal heart rate.

- Decreased movement felt by the mother
- Meconium in the amniotic fluid ("meconium stained fluid")
- Non-reassuring patterns seen on cardiotocography:
  - increased or decreased fetal heart rate (tachycardia and bradycardia), especially during and after a contraction
  - decreased variability in the fetal heart rate
  - late decelerations
- Biochemical signs, assessed by collecting a small sample of baby's blood from a scalp prick through the open cervix in labor
  - fetal metabolic acidosis
  - elevated fetal blood lactate levels (from fetal scalp blood testing) indicating the baby has a lactic acidosis

Some of these signs are more reliable predictors of fetal compromise than others. For example, cardiotocography can give high false positive rates, even when interpreted by highly experienced medical personnel. Fetal acid-base status is a more reliable predictor, but is not always available.

=== Complications ===
Complications are primarily those associated with insufficient fetal oxygenation, most notably increased mortality risk. Other complications include fetal encephalopathy, seizures, cerebral palsy, and neurodevelopmental delay.

== Causes ==
Several conditions and risk factors can lead to fetal distress or non-reassuring fetal status, including:

- Low amniotic fluid (oligohydramnios)
  - If there is too little amniotic fluid around the baby in the uterus, the baby can have trouble moving around in the uterus and its growth and temperature can be impacted. Low amniotic fluid can be caused by placental issues, high gestational blood pressure, some medications, as well as problems with the fetal kidney or urinary tract.
- Meconium in the amniotic fluid
  - If a fetus has meconium in their lungs when they are born, this prevents the pressure in their lungs from falling, which normally facilitates the transition to independent breathing. Since aspiration of meconium can lead to improper oxygenation due to obstruction and carries the potential risk for inflammatory pneumonitis, this is an important diagnosis to make in the setting of newborn respiratory distress.
- Gestational Hypertension
  - If hypertension in the mother occurs after the 20th week and meets certain criteria, this is considered preeclampsia/eclampsia. The mechanism of preeclampsia/eclampsia is unknown, but consequences if left untreated can include fetal growth restriction or death, as well as pose medical risks to the mother. Signs and symptoms of preeclampsia can include swelling, protein in the urine, headaches, vomiting, and abnormal labs that assess kidney and liver function, some of which may be considered severe preeclampsia or eclampsia.
- Post-term pregnancy
- Breathing problems
- Anemia
- Abnormal position and presentation of the fetus
- Multiple births
- Shoulder dystocia
- Umbilical cord prolapse
- Nuchal cord
- Placental abruption
- Premature closure of the fetal ductus arteriosus
- Uterine rupture
- Intrahepatic cholestasis of pregnancy, a liver disorder during pregnancy
- Maternal diabetes (Type 1 or 2) or gestational diabetes (GDM)

== Prevention ==
Monitoring of the mother and fetus prior to birth is critical to avoid complications after birth. This is often done via electronic fetal heart rate (FHR) monitoring, which helps providers monitor the fetus' heart rate to ensure it is receiving enough oxygen, monitor the mother's contractions, and monitor the mother's blood pressure and systemic symptoms for gestational hypertension, preeclampsia, or eclampsia.

== Treatment ==
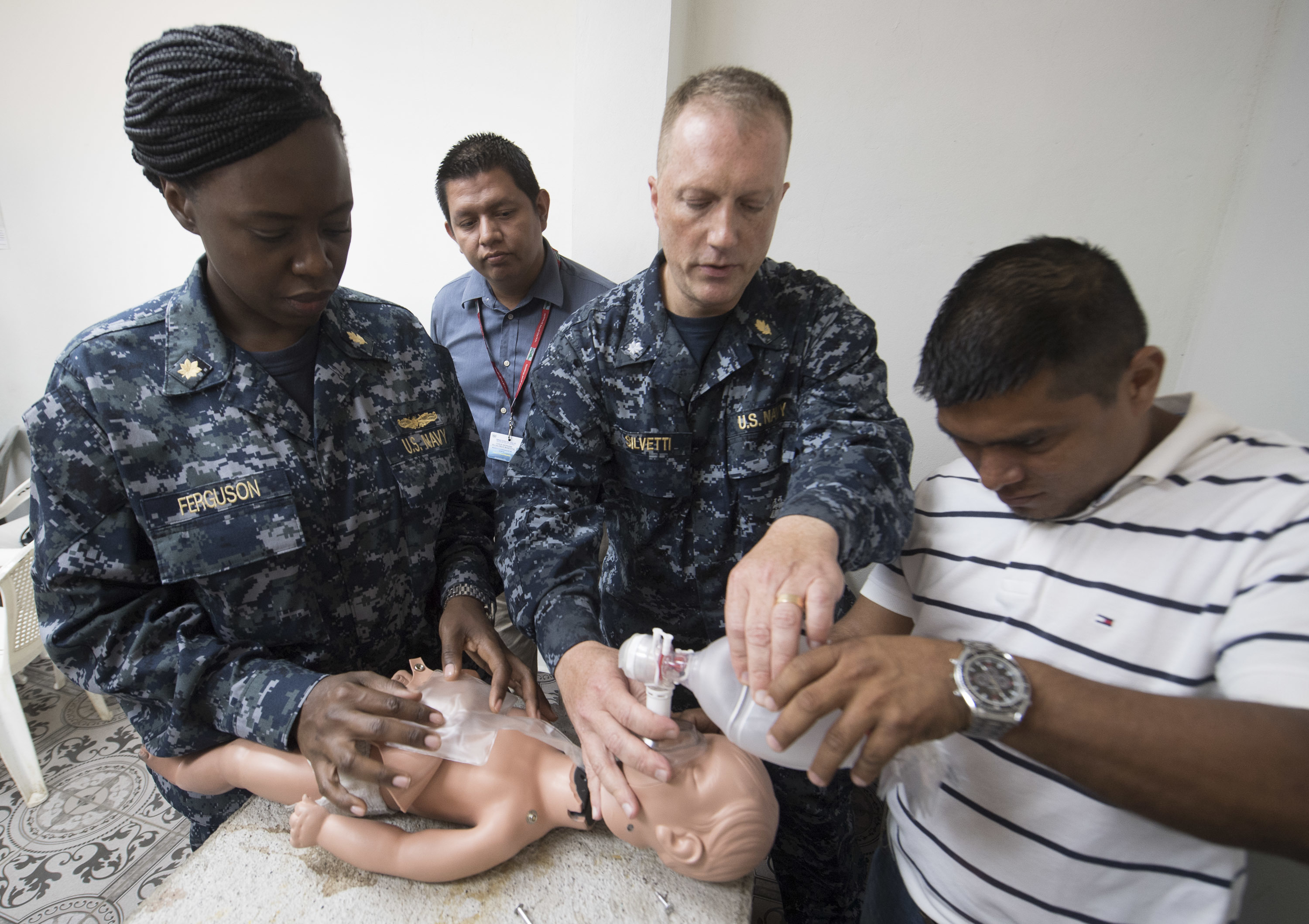
Newborn receiving positive pressure ventilation

Instead of referring to "fetal distress", current recommendations hold to look for more specific signs and symptoms, assess them, and take the appropriate steps to remedy the situation through the implementation of intrauterine resuscitation. Traditionally the diagnosis of "fetal distress" led the obstetrician to recommend rapid delivery by instrumental delivery or by caesarean section if vaginal delivery is not advised.

An algorithm is used to treat/resuscitate babies in need of respiratory support post-birth. The algorithm steps include: clearing the airways and warming, stimulating, and drying the baby, positive-pressure ventilation (PPV), supplementary oxygen, intubation, chest compressions, and pharmacological therapy. The order of these interventions is set, and each step is done for 30 seconds with heart rate monitoring and assessment of chest movement prior to escalating to the next step in the algorithm.
