= Amnioinfusion =

- ICD-9-CM: 75.37

Amnioinfusion is a method in which isotonic fluid is instilled into the uterine cavity.

It was introduced in the 1960s as a means of terminating pregnancy and inducing labor in intrauterine death, but is currently used as a treatment in order to correct fetal heart rate changes caused by umbilical cord compression, indicated by variable decelerations seen on fetal heart rate monitoring. In severe cases of oligohydramnios, amnioinfusion may be performed prophylactically to prevent umbilical cord compression.

It has also been used to reduce the risk of meconium aspiration syndrome, though evidence of benefit is mixed. The UK National Institute of Health and Clinical Excellence (NICE) Guidelines recommend against the use of amnioinfusion in women with meconium stained amniotic fluid (MSAF).

== Uses ==
=== Diagnostic uses ===
Diagnostic uses for amnioinfusion are limited to pregnancies complicated by oligohydramnios. Infusion of saline can allow for better visualization of fetal structures on ultrasound when there is minimal amniotic fluid. Most often, it is used to increase the sensitivity of detecting anomalies with the fetus's urogenital tract that could be contributing to the oligohydramnios. Often amnioinfusion isn't needed, as renal agenesis, one of the most common causes of oligohydramnios, is detectable through Doppler ultrasound.

=== Therapeutic uses ===
Amnioinfusion is used much more therapeutically in the period just before birth:

- Oligohydramnios and anhydramnios (lack of amniotic fluid): amnioinfusion can be used in this setting to prevent pulmonary hypoplasia, which is underdevelopment of the fetal lungs. By increasing the amniotic fluid level, the lungs are inflated, leading to normal growth. Oligohydramnios can also lead to compression deformities, which are caused by the pressure of the uterus on the developing fetus. By decreasing pressure on the developing fetus, amnioinfusion increases space for fetal movement and growth.
- Variable decelerations on fetal heart rate monitoring: These kinds of decelerations in fetal heart rate are caused by umbilical cord compression. This causes risk by decreasing blood flow to the fetus. Amnioinfusion is used as a second-line treatment for these decelerations. By increasing the amount of fluid in the uterus, the umbilical cord will experience less compression. This is usually combined with maternal hydration and repositioning to avoid Cesarean section.
- External cephalic version: The process by which the fetus can be turned from feet- or butt-first in the uterus to head-first can be sometimes made more successful by amnioinfusion by increasing the space the fetus has to move.
- Preterm premature rupture of membranes: This is an active area of research for patients. In review articles, the evidence shows that there is likely a prolongation of gestation and decreased perinatal mortality, neonatal sepsis, and pulmonary hypoplasia.

== Contraindications ==
Relative contraindications for amnioinfusion include intrauterine infection and maternal immunosuppression to avoid systemic infection, placental abruption and evidence of fetal distress on fetal heart rate monitoring as these are more emergent conditions requiring surgery, and uterine contractions because these make it technically difficult to perform transabdominal amnioinfusion.

== Complications ==
Amnioinfusion can be complicated by premature rupture of membranes, intrauterine infection, maternal pulmonary embolus, puncture and hemorrhage of umbilical cord, precipitous labor, and placental abruption. There are minimal literature addressing incidence rates of these various complications. There are also case reports showing concern for amniotic fluid embolus, polyhydramnios, and malpresentation.

It is recommended that amnioinfusion be performed at centers specializing in fetal medicine and within the context of a multidisciplinary team.

== Technique ==
The most common method of amnioinfusion is the transabdominal approach. The abdomen is generally numbed with local anesthesia and a small needle is inserted into the abdomen, through the uterus, and into the intrauterine cavity. This is performed under ultrasound guidance, often with doppler, to avoid injuring the fetus, placenta, or umbilical cord and aspiration is performed at the time to ensure intrauterine placement. Warm normal saline is generally used to then increase the amniotic fluid index to over 5 cm.

Amnioinfusion can also be performed transcervically (through the cervix) after the amniotic sac has ruptured.

== History ==
Amnioinfusion was initially performed as a means of achieving first- and second-trimester abortion through the infusion of formalin and hypertonic glucose. Hypertonic saline was first used in the 1960s in the United States to induce labor in patients whose pregnancy ended in intrauterine death. In the 1970s, hypertonic saline overtook other solutions for performing abortions before 14 weeks of gestation. Due to its high risk for infection, hemorrhage, and retained placental tissue leading to a roughly 10% mortality rate, amnioinfusion was largely replaced by prostaglandin medications for performing abortions in the 1980s. It was at this time that medical providers began to use amnioinfusion for other therapeutic purposes. The first report of using isotonic saline or Lactated Ringers solution for repeated late decelerations on fetal heart tracing was in 1983 using either a spinal needle or transcervical catheter. In the following decade, medical providers found more applications, including preventing meconium aspiration syndrome and perinatal death in patients presenting with meconium-stained amniotic fluid, but these applications proved to be not beneficial in the long-run. It was also used for chorioamnionitis, but a Cochrane Review demonstrated its lack of efficacy.
