= Amnion nodosum =

Amnion nodosum is distinguished by plaques of squamous cells on the amnion's fetal surface. The condition was previously known as "Amnionknötchen" (amniotic nodules) and was first described in 1850. Amnion nodosum is a placental hallmark of severe and prolonged oligohydramnios, and it is associated with a high risk of fetal and perinatal mortality. The cause and pathophysiology of nodule formation in Amnion nodosum are largely unknown.

== Diagnosis ==
The lesion is composed of multiple firm, circumscribed, round to ovoid, raised, shiny, yellow nodules ranging in size from 1 to 5 mm and visible on the amniotic surface. They are made up of a variety of squamous cells embedded in degenerative amorphous acidophilic debris.

These lesions can be found on the amniotic surface, embedded in the amniotic mesoderm, or projecting through the amnion into the spongy layer cleft between the amnion and the chorion. The amniotic epithelium can be present as a complete or incomplete cell layer between the nodule's basal side and the basement membrane. The epithelium looks identical to that of the adjacent uninvolved amnion between the nodules and appears to be continuous with it on occasion, often with hyperplastic changes.

The ultrastructure of the nodules reveals that they are mostly made up of closely packed bundles of fibrillary material with a high electron density and cellular elements of various types that are irregularly dispersed within the fibrillary mass. The basement membrane of the amnion epithelium is usually present beneath the nodules and appears multilaminated at times. This indicates that the process is mostly superficial, and the underlying stroma does not play a role in lesion formation. The microscopic and ultrastructural features support the theory that Amnion nodosum is made up of deposits of cellular elements from the fetal skin that accumulate and organize on the surface of the amniotic epithelium and undergo secondary degenerative changes before being invaded by connective tissue.
