= Oligohydramnios =

Deficiency of amniotic fluid in the amniotic sac

- Specialty: Obstetrics
- Risk factors: Miscarriage, stillbirth (20/28) weeks

Oligohydramnios is a medical condition in pregnancy characterized by a deficiency of amniotic fluid, the fluid that surrounds the fetus in the abdomen, in the amniotic sac. The limiting case is anhydramnios, where there is a complete absence of amniotic fluid. It is typically diagnosed by ultrasound when the amniotic fluid index (AFI) measures less than 5 cm or when the single deepest pocket (SDP) of amniotic fluid measures less than 2 cm. Amniotic fluid is necessary to allow for normal fetal movement, lung development, and cushioning from uterine compression. Low amniotic fluid can be attributed to a maternal, fetal, placental or idiopathic cause and can result in poor fetal outcomes including death. The prognosis of the fetus is dependent on the etiology, gestational age at diagnosis, and the severity of the oligohydramnios.

The opposite of oligohydramnios is polyhydramnios, or an excess of amniotic fluid.

== Background ==
Amniotic fluid is a clear, watery substance that surrounds the fetus. It helps to maintain a constant temperature around the fetus, cushion it from injury, and allows for proper fetal movement and organ development. The cause of anhydramnios is not always clear, but several factors can contribute to its development such as fetal renal abnormalities or placental insufficiency. Untreated anhydramnios can lead to serious complications for the baby, including pulmonary hypoplasia or skeletal deformities.

== Etiology ==
The amount of amniotic fluid available is based on how much fluid is produced and how much is removed from the amniotic sac. In the first trimester, the main sources of amniotic fluid are fetal lung secretions, transportation of maternal plasma across the fetal membranes, and the surface of the placenta. By the second trimester, the fetal kidneys start to produce urine which becomes the main source of the amniotic fluid for the remainder of the pregnancy.

The development of oligohydramnios may be idiopathic or have a maternal, fetal, or placental cause.

=== Maternal ===
- Conditions such as preeclampsia, chronic hypertension, collagen vascular disease, nephropathy, and thrombophilia cause uteroplacental insufficiency. These conditions decrease the blood flow to vital organs such as the placenta which supplies blood, oxygen, and nutrients to the developing fetus. Decreased blood flow to the fetus causes impaired urine production which leads to reduced amniotic fluid and oligohydramnios.
- Medications such as angiotensin converting enzyme inhibitors (lisinopril), prostaglandin synthetase inhibitors (NSAIDs, anti-inflammatory steroids), and trastuzumab decrease blood flow to the kidneys of the fetus. When the fetal kidneys are not able to produce adequate amounts of urine, this leads to reduced amniotic fluid or oligohydramnios. Some medications, such as nimesulide and chemotherapeutic agents, have been linked to anhydramnios.
- Maternal dehydration, including severe diarrhea, vomiting, or excessive fluid loss.
- Infections such as the TORCH infections (Toxoplasma gondii, rubella, cytomegalovirus, herpes simplex virus) and parvovirus B19

=== Fetal ===
- Chromosomal abnormalities such as Down syndrome which are associated with gastrointestinal abnormalities
- Congenital abnormalities such as renal agenesis and cystic renal disease are associated with impaired urine production, and posterior urethral valves or urethral atresia which are associated with obstruction of the lower urinary tract. Fetal renal abnormalities can encompass various kidney-related issues, including bilateral renal agenesis, also known as Potter syndrome, which is the most prevalent cause of anhydramnios.
- Intrauterine demise
- Post-term pregnancy
- Rupture of membranes
- Intrauterine growth restriction (IUGR) associated with placental insufficiency. Insufficient fetal growth can result in reduced amniotic fluid volume. When the fetus is not growing appropriately, it may have a reduced ability to produce urine, which is a significant contributor to amniotic fluid.
- Amnion nodosum; failure of secretion by the cells of the amnion covering the placenta

=== Placental ===
- Placental abruption
- Placental insufficiency: This is a condition in which the placenta does not function properly, leading to an insufficient supply of oxygen and nutrients to the developing baby, potentially affecting amniotic fluid production.
- Twin-twin transfusion
- Placental thrombosis or infarction

== Diagnosis ==
=== Clinical manifestation ===
The volume of amniotic fluid typically increases until 36 weeks and starts decreasing after 40 weeks in post-term gestations. For this reason, discrepancies between fundal height measurements and gestational age can be a clinical indication of amniotic fluid abnormality and should be evaluated by ultrasound. The symptoms of anhydramnios may not always be apparent, but some potential signs include:

- A decrease in the size of the baby's abdomen
- Decreased fetal movement
- Uterine contractions not associated with pain

=== Diagnosis ===
Diagnosis of oligohydramnios or anhydramnios is made by conducting a transabdominal ultrasound of the abdomen.

There are two methods that can be used to make the diagnosis: the amniotic fluid index (AFI) and the single deepest pocket (SDP) measurement. An AFI of less than 5 cm or an SDP of less than 2 cm indicates oligohydramnios, and an AFI of 0 cm or an absent SDP indicates anhydramnios. In measuring the AFI, the sonographer measures the amniotic fluid in each of the four quadrants of the abdomen (right upper quadrant, left upper quadrant, right lower quadrant, left lower quadrant) and adds the values together. For reference, a normal AFI is 5–25 cm. An AFI <5 cm is considered oligohydramnios and an AFI >25 cm is considered polyhydramnios. Randomized control trials have shown that use of AFI can cause an increased number of false positive diagnosis of oligohydramnios and recommend using the measurement of a single deepest pocket (SDP) of amniotic fluid to diagnose oligohydramnios instead.

To calculate a single deepest pocket, the sonographer scans each of the four quadrants of the abdomen looking for the deepest pocket of amniotic fluid that does not include any fetal body parts or an umbilical cord. It is measured from the 12 o'clock position to the 6 o'clock position. For reference, a normal SDP is 2–8 cm. A SDP <2 cm is considered oligohydramnios and a SDP >8 cm is considered polyhydramnios. The use of a SDP for diagnosis of oligohydramnios is associated with less false positives and thus less unnecessary interventions without an increase in adverse perinatal outcomes.

In a multiple gestation pregnancy, measuring a single deepest pocket is the most accurate determination of adequate amniotic fluid levels.

== Management ==
After initial diagnosis of oligohydramnios has been made, the next step is to perform a thorough history and physical exam, followed by diagnostic testing if indicated. Timely diagnosis and proper intervention for anhydramnios can significantly enhance the outlook for infants affected by this condition. The treatment depends on the underlying cause and may include:

- Amnioinfusion: Injection of amniotic fluid into the womb, can help to improve fetal lung development and reduce the risk of complications
- Fetal monitoring: Close monitoring of the fetus is crucial to assess its well-being and detect any potential complications
- Delivery: The timing of delivery may need to be adjusted depending on the severity of anhydramnios and the health of the fetus

Other point to note are:

- Retaking a maternal and family history and performing a physical exam can point to maternal conditions or medications that might be causing the oligohydramnios.
- Premature prelabor rupture of membranes or prelabor rupture of membranes is ruled out with a nitrizine test, evidence of ferning, or evidence pooling of liquid in the cervix.
- Sonographic evaluation of the fetus is done to identify fetal anomalies, aneuploidy, fetal growth restriction, or placental abnormalities. The National Institute of Health recommends detailed documentation of certain fetal organs that are most likely to be involved such as the kidneys, bladder, and the umbilical cord. If the lack of amniotic fluid prevents accurate visualization on ultrasound, MRI imaging can be considered. Genetic testing can be useful if fetal anomalies are documented on imaging.
- An elevated maternal serum alpha fetal protein (MSAFP) can indicate leaking amniotic fluid due to damage to fetal membranes or the placenta. This is associated with a poor prognosis.
- A maternal blood test or amniotic fluid test can be performed if suspicion of a TORCH infection is high.

=== Increasing amniotic fluid ===
There is no way to permanently increase the volume of amniotic fluid, but it can be temporarily increased to allow for a complete anatomy scan of the fetus on ultrasound.

One way to achieve this is through an amnioinfusion, which is the insertion of 200 mL of saline into the amniotic sac. One study showed an improvement in fetal structure visibility by 26% (51% to 77% before and after the infusion respectively). There is also some low quality data that may indicate a potential benefit of amnioinfusion is to facilitate external cephalic version. Amnioinfusion can be used during labor to prevent umbilical cord compression. There is uncertainty about the procedure's safety and efficacy, and it is recommended that it should only be performed in centers specializing in invasive fetal medicine and in the context of a multidisciplinary team.

One to two liters of oral hydration can temporarily increase amniotic fluid in dehydrated patients with isolated oligohydramnios.

Other investigational therapies may also be useful such as desmopressin, tissue sealants, or sildenafil citrate. These methods are less commonly used and are experimental.

In case of congenital lower urinary tract obstruction, fetal surgery seems to improve survival, according to a randomized yet small study.

=== Prenatal care ===
Patients who are preterm are managed in the outpatient setting with weekly or biweekly testing to monitor for accurate fetal growth and decrease chances of unexpected fetal death. This includes a weekly non-stress test (NST) and single deepest pocket (SDP) assessment which is also referred to as the modified BPP. Sonographic fetal growth exams may also be indicated.

=== Timing of delivery ===
Idiopathic, uncomplicated, and persistent oligohydramnios can be delivered at 36 0/7 weeks – 37 6/7 weeks of gestation or at diagnosis if diagnosis is later.

=== Complications ===
Complications may include cord compression, musculoskeletal abnormalities such as facial distortion and clubfoot, pulmonary hypoplasia and intrauterine growth restriction. Amnion nodosum is frequently also present (nodules on the fetal surface of the amnion).

The use of oligohydramnios as a predictor of gestational complications is controversial.

Potter syndrome is a condition caused by oligohydramnios. Affected fetuses develop pulmonary hypoplasia, limb deformities, and characteristic facies. Bilateral agenesis of the fetal kidneys is the most common cause due to the lack of fetal urine.

== Prognosis ==
The prognosis of anhydramnios depends on the underlying cause and the severity of the condition. In general, the prognosis is poor for babies with anhydramnios caused by fetal renal abnormalities, with a high mortality rate. However, the prognosis is better for babies with anhydramnios caused by other factors, such as premature rupture of membranes (PPROM).

Factors that affect the prognosis of anhydramnios include:

- The underlying cause of the anhydramnios: Babies with anhydramnios caused by fetal renal abnormalities have a much poorer prognosis than babies with anhydramnios caused by other factors.
- The severity of the anhydramnios: Babies with severe anhydramnios have a poorer prognosis than babies with mild anhydramnios.
- The gestational age at diagnosis: Babies with anhydramnios diagnosed in the early stages of pregnancy have a poorer prognosis than babies with anhydramnios diagnosed in the later stages of pregnancy.
- The presence of other complications: Babies with anhydramnios who also have other complications, such as fetal growth restriction or skeletal deformities, have a poorer prognosis than babies with anhydramnios who do not have other complications.

With early diagnosis and appropriate treatment, many babies with anhydramnios can be born healthy. However, the prognosis for babies with anhydramnios caused by fetal renal abnormalities remains poor. These babies may require long-term medical care and may have developmental disabilities.

== See also ==
- Fetal intervention
- Potter's sequence
