= Basal plate (placenta) =

Anatomical structure in pregnancy

Details
- Carnegie stage: 13

Identifiers
- Latin: Lamina basalis

During pregnancy changes in the placenta involve the disappearance of the greater portion of the stratum compactum, but the deeper part of this layer persists and is condensed to form what is known as the basal plate. Between this plate and the uterine muscular fibres are the stratum spongiosum and the boundary layer; through these and the basal plate the uterine arteries and veins pass to and from the intervillous space. Decidual septum is one of the structures derived from basal plate.
