= Meconium =

Earliest feces of a mammalian infant

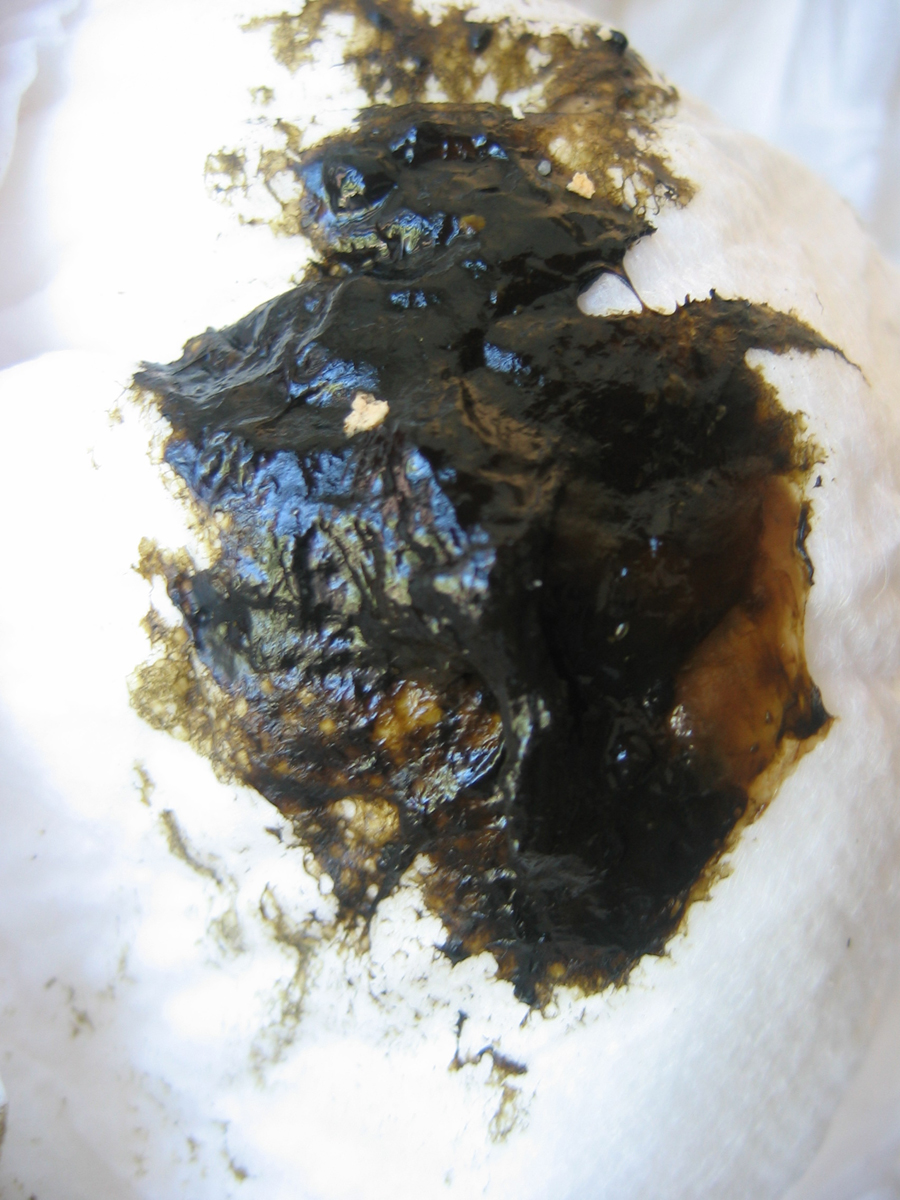
- Meconium from 12-hour-old newborn – the baby's third bowel movement Scale: 5 cm left to right.
- Specialty: Pediatrics

Meconium is the earliest stool of a mammalian infant resulting from defecation. Unlike later feces, meconium is composed of materials ingested during the time the infant spends in the uterus: intestinal epithelial cells, lanugo, mucus, amniotic fluid, bile, and water. Meconium, unlike later feces, is viscous and sticky like tar – its color usually being a very dark olive green and it is almost odorless. When diluted in amniotic fluid, it may appear in various shades of green, brown, or yellow. It should be completely passed by the end of the first few days after birth, with the stools progressing toward yellow (digested milk).

== Clinical significance ==
=== Meconium in amniotic fluid ===
Meconium is normally retained in the infant's bowel until after birth, but sometimes it is expelled into the amniotic fluid prior to birth or during labor and delivery. The stained amniotic fluid is recognized by medical staff as a possible sign of fetal distress. Some post-dates pregnancies (when they are more than 40 weeks pregnant) may also have meconium-stained amniotic fluid without fetal distress. Medical staff may aspirate the meconium from the nose and mouth of a newborn immediately after delivery in the event the baby shows signs of respiratory distress to decrease the risk of meconium aspiration syndrome, which can occur in meconium-stained amniotic fluid.

Most of the time that the amniotic fluid is stained with meconium, it will be homogeneously distributed throughout the fluid, making it brown. This indicates that the fetus passed the meconium some time ago such that sufficient mixing occurred as to establish the homogeneous mixture. Terminal meconium occurs when the fetus passes the meconium a short enough time before birth/cesarean section that the amniotic fluid remains clear, but individual clumps of meconium are in the fluid.

=== Failure to pass meconium ===
The failure to pass meconium is a symptom of several diseases including Hirschsprung's disease and cystic fibrosis.

The meconium sometimes becomes thickened and congested in the intestines, a condition known as meconium ileus. Meconium ileus is often the first sign of cystic fibrosis. In cystic fibrosis, the meconium can form a bituminous black-green mechanical obstruction in a segment of the ileum. Beyond this, there may be a few separate grey-white globular pellets. Below this level, the bowel is a narrow and empty micro-colon. Above the level of the obstruction, there are several loops of hypertrophied bowel distended with fluid. No meconium is passed, and abdominal distension and vomiting appear soon after birth. About 20% of cases of cystic fibrosis present with meconium ileus, while approximately 20% of one series of cases of meconium ileus did not have cystic fibrosis. The presence of meconium ileus is not related to the severity of the cystic fibrosis. The obstruction can be relieved in a number of ways.

Meconium ileus should be distinguished from meconium plug syndrome, in which a tenacious mass of mucus prevents the meconium from passing and there is no risk of intestinal perforation. Meconium ileus has a significant risk of intestinal perforation. In a barium enema, meconium plug syndrome shows a normal or dilated colon as compared to micro-colon in meconium ileus.

=== Testing meconium for drugs ===
Meconium can be tested for various drugs, to check for in utero exposure. Using meconium, a Canadian research group showed that by measuring a by-product of alcohol, fatty acid ethyl esters (FAEE), they could objectively detect excessive maternal alcohol consumption during pregnancy.

In the US, the results of meconium testing may be used by child protective services and other law enforcement agencies if the capacity of the parents to look after their child is in question. Meconium can also be analyzed to detect the tobacco use of mothers during their pregnancy, which is commonly under-reported.

== Sterility ==
The issue of whether meconium is sterile remains debated and is an area of ongoing research. Although some researchers have reported evidence of bacteria in meconium, this has not been consistently confirmed. Other researchers have raised questions about whether these findings may be due to contamination after sample collection and that meconium is, in fact, sterile until after birth. Further researchers have hypothesized that there may be bacteria in the womb, but these are a normal part of pregnancy and could have an important role in shaping the developing immune system and are not harmful to the baby.

== Etymology ==
The Latin term meconium derives from Greek μηκώνιον, mēkōnion, a diminutive of μήκων, mēkōn 'poppy', in reference either to its tar-like appearance that may resemble some raw opium preparations or to Aristotle's belief that it induces sleep in the fetus.

== Other uses ==
- In biology, meconium describes the metabolic waste product from the pupal stage of an insect that is expelled through the anal opening of the adult upon eclosion from the pupa. Other insects, such as beetles and some Hymenoptera (Aculeata) expel the meconium at the end of the larval stage, before becoming a pupa.

== Gallery ==
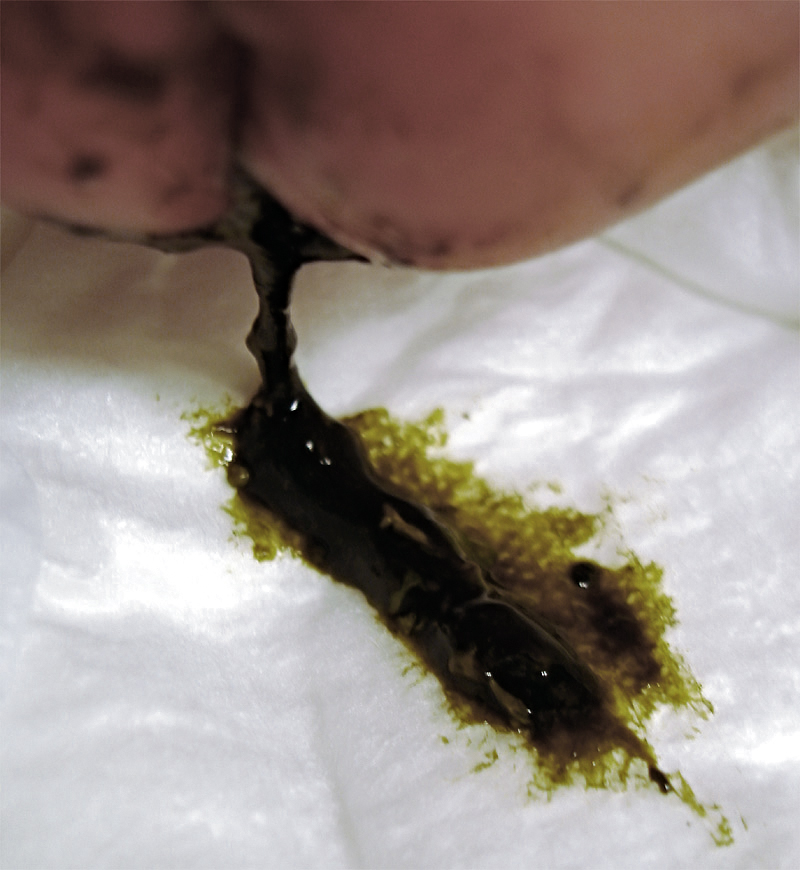
Newborn evacuating meconium.

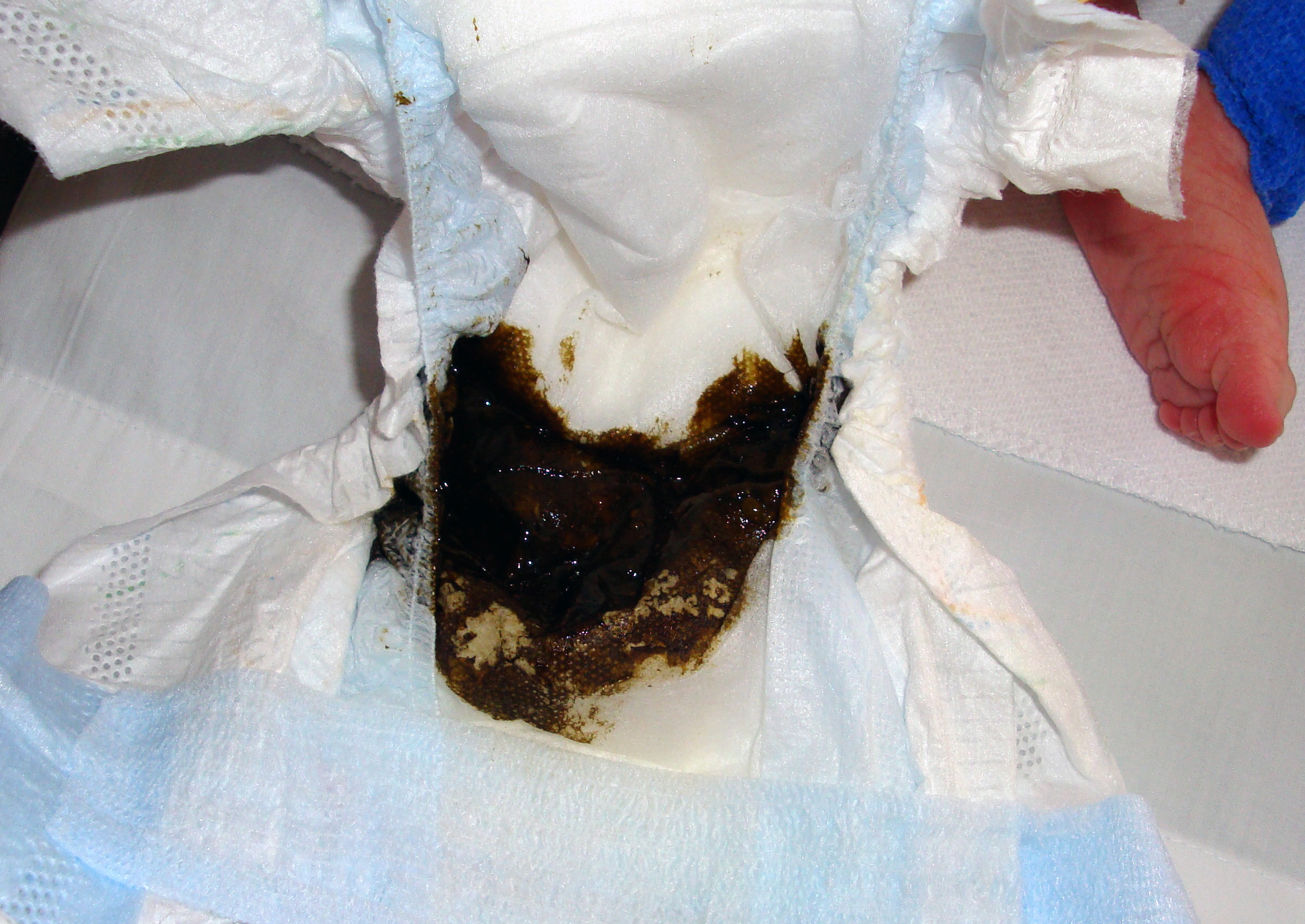
Meconium from 13-hour-old newborn.

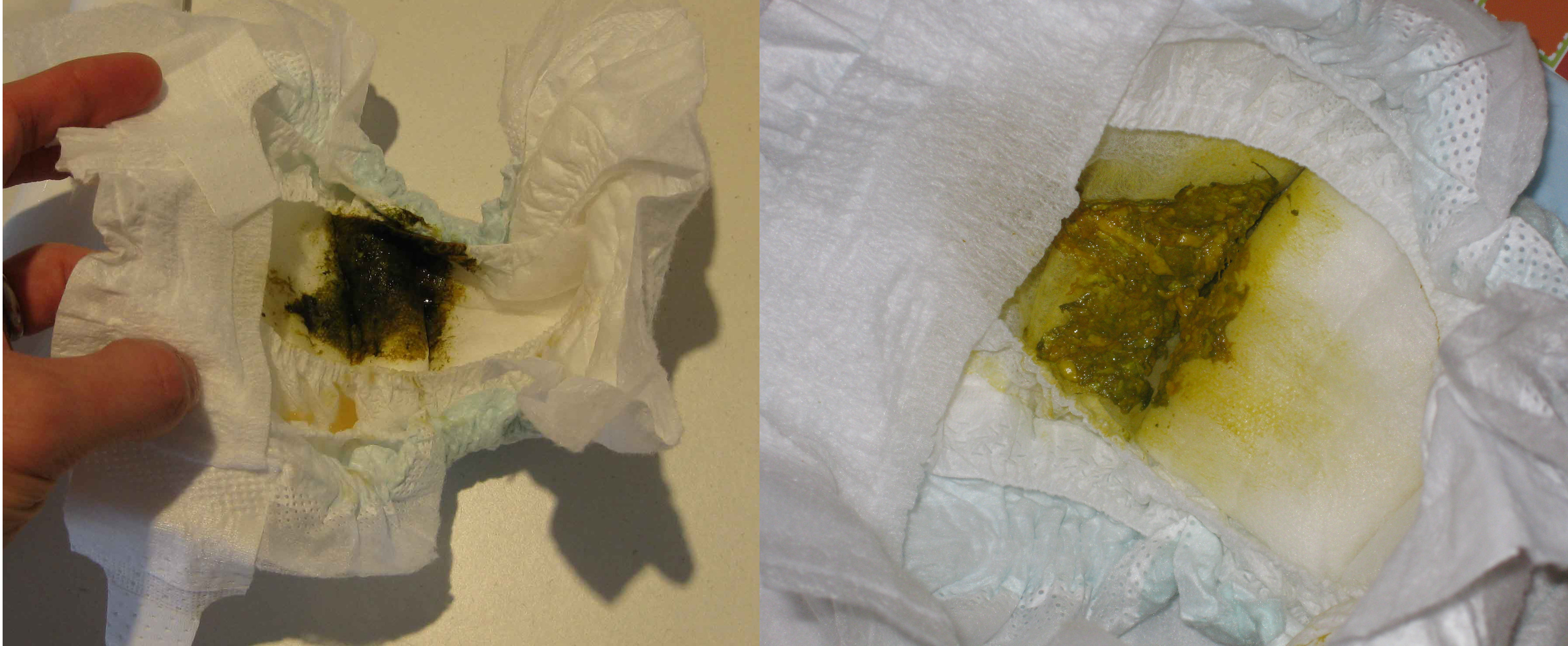
This image compares the appearance of meconium (from 48 hours after normal delivery at term) to the appearance of the same infant's feces after 1 week of breastfeeding.
