= Perinatal mortality =

- Other names: Perinatal death
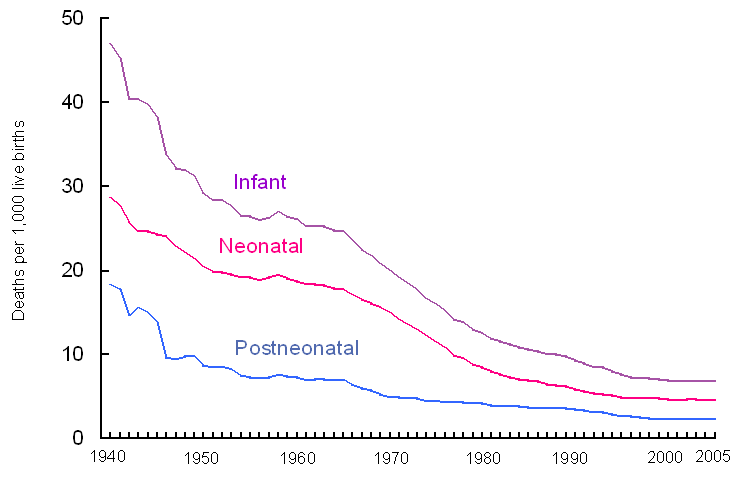
- Infant, neonatal, and postneonatal mortality rates: United States, 1940–2005
- Specialty: Public health

Perinatal mortality (PNM) is the death of a fetus or neonate and is the basis for calculation of the perinatal mortality rate. Perinatal means "relating to the period starting a few weeks before birth and including the birth and a few weeks after birth."

Variations in the precise definition of the perinatal mortality exist, specifically concerning the issue of inclusion or exclusion of early fetal and late neonatal fatalities. The World Health Organization defines perinatal mortality as the "number of stillbirths and deaths in the first week of life per 1,000 total births, the perinatal period commences at 22 completed weeks (154 days) of gestation, and ends seven completed days after birth", but other definitions have been used.

The UK figure is about 8 per 1,000 and varies markedly by social class, with the highest rates seen in Asian women. Globally, an estimated 2.6 million neonates died in 2013 before the first month of age, down from 4.5 million in 1990.

== Causes ==
Preterm birth is the most common cause of perinatal mortality, causing almost 30 percent of neonatal deaths. Infant respiratory distress syndrome, in turn, is the leading cause of death in preterm infants, affecting about 1% of newborn infants. Birth defects cause about 21 percent of neonatal death.

Some major causes of perinatal mortality rate are:

- Maternal diseases
- Pelvic diseases: endometriosis, ovarian tumor
- Anatomical defects: Uterine, cervical anomalies
- Endocrine imbalance
- Blood incompatibilities
- Malnutrition
- Toxemias of pregnancy
- APH
- Congenital defects
- Advanced maternal age

== Fetal mortality ==
Fetal mortality refers to stillbirths or fetal death. It encompasses any death of a fetus after 20 weeks of gestation or 500 gm. In some definitions of the PNM, early fetal mortality (week 20–27 gestation) is not included, and the PNM may only include late fetal death and neonatal death. Fetal death can also be divided into death before labor, antenatal (antepartum) death, and death during labor, intranatal (intrapartum) death.

== Neonatal mortality ==
Neonatal mortality refers to the death of a live-born baby within the first 28 days of life. Early neonatal mortality refers to the death of a live-born baby within the first seven days of life, while late neonatal mortality refers to death after 7 days until before 28 days. Some definitions of the PNM include only the early neonatal mortality. Neonatal mortality is affected by the quality of in-hospital care for the neonate. Neonatal mortality and postneonatal mortality (covering the remaining 11 months of the first year of life) are reflected in the infant mortality rate.

== Perinatal mortality rate ==
Top ten countries with the highest perinatal mortality rates – 2012
Rank	Country	PNMR	Rank	Country	PNMR
1	Pakistan	40.7	6	Afghanistan	29.0
2	Nigeria	32.7	7	Bangladesh	28.9
3	Sierra Leone	30.8	8	Democratic Republic of the Congo	28.3
4	Somalia	29.7	9	Lesotho	27.5
5	Guinea-Bissau	29.4	10	Angola	27.4
As per 2014 "Save the Children" report for intrapartum stillbirths and neonatal deaths on first day of birth (per 1,000 total births)

The PNMR refers to the number of perinatal deaths per 1,000 total births. It is usually reported annually. It is a major marker to assess the quality of health care delivery. Varying definitions, registration bias, and differences in the underlying risks of the populations may hamper comparisons between different rates.

PNMRs vary widely and may be below 10 for certain developed countries and more than 10 times higher in developing countries. The WHO has not published contemporary data.

== Effects of neonatal nutrition on neonatal mortality ==
Probiotic supplementation of preterm and low birthweight babies during their first month of life can reduce the risk of blood infections, bowel sickness, and death in low- and middle-income settings. However, supplementing with Vitamin A does not reduce the risk of death and increases the risk of bulging fontanelle, which may cause brain damage.

== See also ==
- Maternal death
- Miscarriage
- Neonatal intensive care unit
- Neonaticide
- Stillbirth
