= Placental disease =

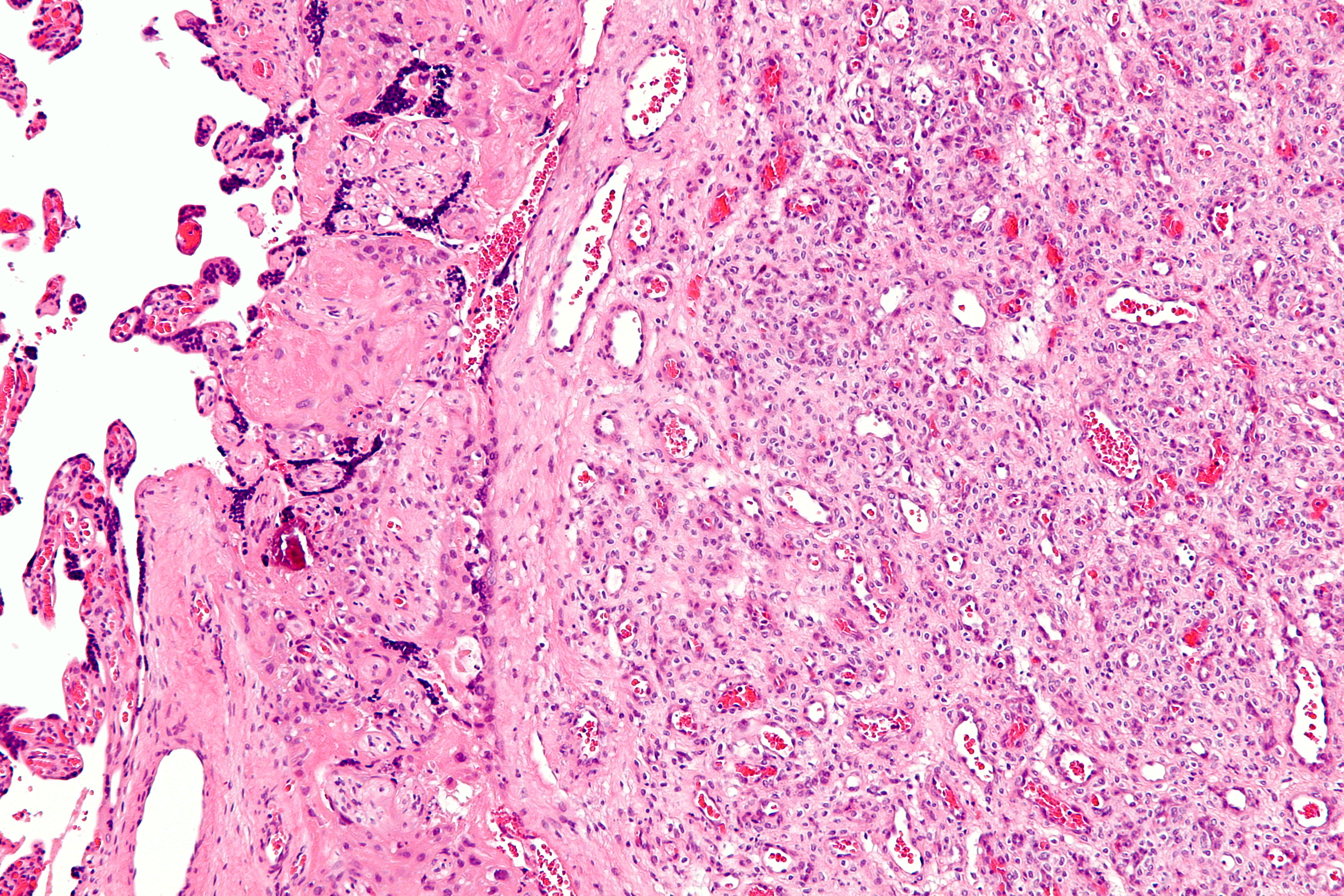
- Micrograph of a chorangioma. H&E stain.
- Specialty: Gynecology

A placental disease is any disease, disorder, or pathology of the placenta.

Ischemic placental disease leads to the attachment of the placenta to the uterine wall to become under-perfused, causing uteroplacental ischemia. Where the term overarches the pathology associated with preeclampsia, placental abruptions and intrauterine growth restriction (IUGR). These factors are known to be the primary pathophysiology cause placental disease. Which is considered to be associated with more than half of premature births.

Abnormalities present within the spiral arteries lead to higher velocities in blood, in turn causes the maternal villi to shred. Which trigger pro-coagulator molecules to be released into the blood stream causing action of the coagulator cascade, eventually leading to placental infarction. Risk factors such as diabetes, chronic blood pressure and multiple pregnancies can increase the risk of developing placental disease. Also, exposure to sudden trauma can increase the risk of placental abruption which coincides with placental disease.

There is no target treatment available for placental disease. Associative prevention mechanisms can be a method of minimising the risk of developing the disease, within early stages of pregnancy.

Placental syndromes include pregnancy loss, fetal growth restriction, preeclampsia, preterm delivery, premature rupture of membranes, placental abruption and intrauterine fetal demise.

== Signs and symptoms ==
The abnormal spiral arteries lead decreased level of oxygen diffusion through the placental villus, which cause chronic hypoxia. The abnormal trophoblast invasion, lead to overall uteroplacental insufficiencies and uteroplacental underperfusion. It is due to the decreased vascularisation, there are reduced levels of nutrient delivery to the foetus. Also, cases of still births can be associated with placental disease.

== Causes ==
Preeclampsia is considered to be linked with Placental Disease, as well as intrauterine growth restriction (IUGR) and placental abruptions are risk factors that lead to placental disease. Especially when these symptoms are evident at early stages of pregnancy. The abnormal invasion of the trophoblast cells, lack of important growth factors such as vascular endothelial growth factor (VEGF) and placental growth factor (PlGF), has an association with the onset of placental disease.

=== Risk factors ===
Risk factors associated with placental disease are as follows:

- Smoking cigarettes and use other forms of drugs such as cocaine.
- Diabetes mellitus
- Maternal age less than 20 years or over the age of 35
- Multiple pregnancies
- Chronic high blood pressure
- Being underweight or obese

Also, chronic renal disease, collagen vascular disease, thrombophilia, and cardiovascular disease increase the risk of developing placental disease. Moreover, being exposed to severe trauma within the pregnancy period, rapid acceleration and deceleration and uterine compression increase the risk of placental abruption, in turn leading to placental disease.

=== Adherence/penetration ===
- Abruptio placentae
- Placenta accreta
- Placenta increta
- Placenta percreta

=== Inflammatory/infectious ===
- Placentitis

- Villitis of unknown etiology
- TORCH infections

=== Placental development ===
- Circumvallate placenta
- Placental villous immaturity

=== Obstruction of os ===
- Placenta previa
- Vasa previa

=== Vascular ===
- Fetal thrombotic vasculopathy
- Hypertrophic decidual vasculopathy
- Chorangiosis
- Chorangioma
- Placental infarction

=== Neoplastic ===
Trophoblastic neoplasms derive from trophoblastic tissue. Examples include:

- Choriocarcinoma
- Hydatidiform mole

== Mechanism ==
In placental disease, there's abnormalities present within the spiral arties of the uterus, where the terminal part of the spinal arteries does not dilate. This leads to decrease oxygen carried past the maternal villi into the intervillus space. The lack of terminal dilation and inclining blood velocity causes shredding of the villi into the maternal blood, releasing blood coagulants activating the coagulation cascade. Which then leads to blocking of the blood vessels causing placental infarction.

== Diagnosis ==
Placental Disease can be diagnosed through technologies such as, Prenatal ultrasound evaluation and invasive foetal testing. The size of the foetus is taken into account through ultrasonography in terms of intrauterine growth restriction (IUGR). In conjunction with taking into account the maternal history. Suspicions may be confirmed by postpartum examination of the placenta.

== Prevention ==
The following factors can be linked with reducing the likelihood of developing placental disease:

- Use of aspirin, can reduce the risks associated with preeclampsia
- Low calcium intake can reduce the risk of preeclampsia
- Reducing oxidative stress present within the body
- Intake of prenatal multivitamins

== Treatment ==
Treatment of placental disease would require a premature birth, in order to avoid a still birth.

== Epidemiology ==
Placental disease is more common in preterm gestation than with full term. Which leads to serious injuries to both the mother and the new-born. Women who endured placental disease within the first pregnancy has an increased risk of the disease progressing within future pregnancies. The onset of the disease within the first trimester leads to preterm delivery of a premature baby. Preeclampsia is diagnosed in 3-5% of pregnancies that place them at risk of developing placental disease. Ischemic placental disease is linked with approximately more than half of premature births.
