= Intrauterine hypoxia =

Medical condition when the fetus is deprived of sufficient oxygen

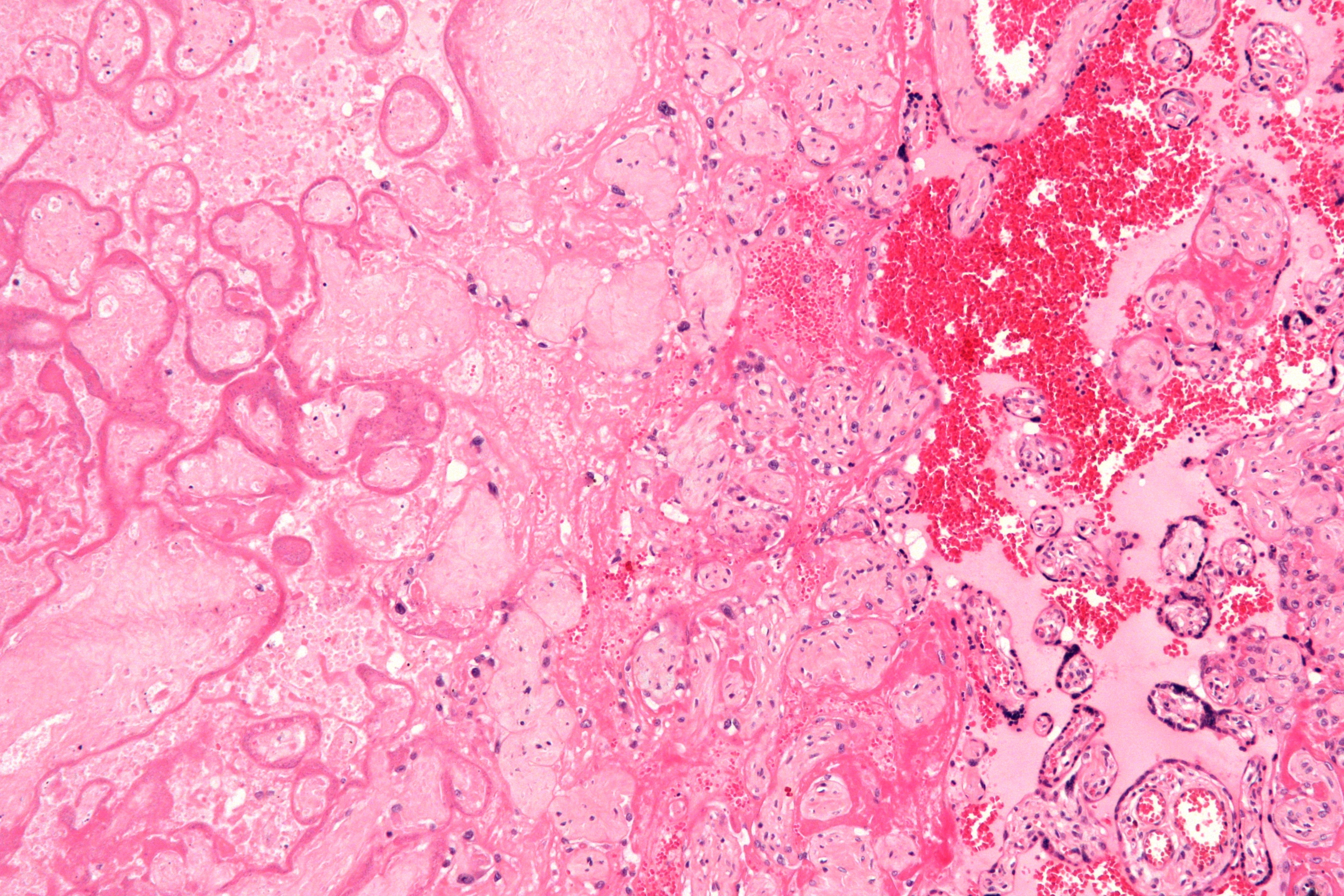
- Micrograph of a placental infarct (left of image), a cause of intrauterine hypoxia. H&E stain.
- Specialty: Pediatrics

Intrauterine hypoxia (also known as fetal hypoxia) occurs when the fetus is deprived of an adequate supply of oxygen. It may be due to a variety of reasons such as prolapse or occlusion of the umbilical cord, placental infarction, maternal diabetes (prepregnancy or gestational diabetes) and maternal smoking. Intrauterine growth restriction may cause or be the result of hypoxia. Intrauterine hypoxia can cause cellular damage that occurs within the central nervous system (the brain and spinal cord). This results in an increased mortality rate, including an increased risk of sudden infant death syndrome (SIDS). Oxygen deprivation in the fetus and neonate have been implicated as either a primary or as a contributing risk factor in numerous neurological and neuropsychiatric disorders such as epilepsy, attention deficit hyperactivity disorder, eating disorders and cerebral palsy.

== Presentation ==
=== Maternal Consequences ===
Complications arising from intrauterine hypoxia are some of most common causes of preeclampsia. Preeclampsia is a hypertensive disorder that occurs during the second trimester (after the 20th week of pregnancy) resulting from a poorly perfused placenta. The World Health Organization estimates that preeclampsia and eclampsia are responsible for about 14% of maternal deaths globally (around 50,000 to 75,000 deaths annually).

During pregnancy, women with preeclampsia faces serious risk of damage to vital organs such as the kidneys, liver, brain, and the blood system. This hypertensive disorder may also cause damage to the placenta leading to issues such as premature births, miscarriages, placental abruption, or even stillbirths. In some cases, preeclampsia can eventually lead to stroke and organ failure. Untreated, preeclampsia can progress and turn into eclampsia which is much more severe with the addition of seizures. Eclampsia seizures could lead to uncontrollable twitching and a loss of consciousness, which could potentially lead to the death of the mother and or the baby.

== Cause ==

Intrauterine hypoxia can be attributed to maternal, placental, or fetal conditions. Kingdom and Kaufmann classifies three categories for the origin of fetal hypoxia: 1) pre-placental (both mother and fetus are hypoxic), 2) utero-placental (mother is normal but placenta and fetus is hypoxic), 3) post-placental (only fetus is hypoxic).

Pre-placental hypoxia is most commonly caused by external hypoxic environments (such as high altitude). It can also be caused by maternal respiratory conditions (such as asthma), cardiovascular conditions (such as heart failure, pulmonary hypertension, and cyanotic heart disease), and hematological conditions (such as anemia). Conditions such as obesity, nutritional deficiencies, infections, chronic inflammations, and stress can also affect the maternal oxygen supply and fetal uptake.

The most preventable cause is maternal smoking. Cigarette smoking by expectant mothers has been shown to have a wide variety of deleterious effects on the developing fetus. Among the negative effects are carbon monoxide induced tissue hypoxia and placental insufficiency which causes a reduction in blood flow from the uterus to the placenta thereby reducing the availability of oxygenated blood to the fetus. Placental insufficiency as a result of smoking has been shown to have a causal effect in the development of pre-eclampsia. While some previous studies have suggested that carbon monoxide from cigarette smoke may have a protective effect against preeclampsia, a recent study conducted by the Genetics of Pre-Eclampsia Consortium in the United Kingdom found that smokers were five times more likely to develop pre-eclampsia. Nicotine alone has been shown to be a teratogen which affects the autonomic nervous system, leading to increased susceptibility to hypoxia-induced brain damage. Maternal anemia in which smoking has also been implicated is another factor associated with IH/BA. Smoking by expectant mothers causes a decrease in maternal nucleated red blood cells, thereby reducing the amount of red blood cells available for oxygen transport.

Utero-placental hypoxia is associated with abnormal placental implantation, impaired vascular remodeling and vascular diseases. It is also associated with pregnancies complicated by gestational hypertension, intrauterine growth restriction, and pre-eclampsia.

Post-placental hypoxia is associated with mechanical obstructions of the umbilical cords, reduced uterine artery flow, progressive fetal cardiac failure, and genetic anomalies.

The perinatal brain injury occurring as a result of birth asphyxia, manifesting within 48 hours of birth, is a form of hypoxic ischemic encephalopathy.

== Treatment ==
Treatment of infants with birth asphyxia by lowering the core body temperature is now known to be an effective therapy to reduce mortality and improve neurological outcome in survivors, and hypothermia therapy for neonatal encephalopathy begun within 6 hours of birth significantly increases the chance of normal survival in affected infants.

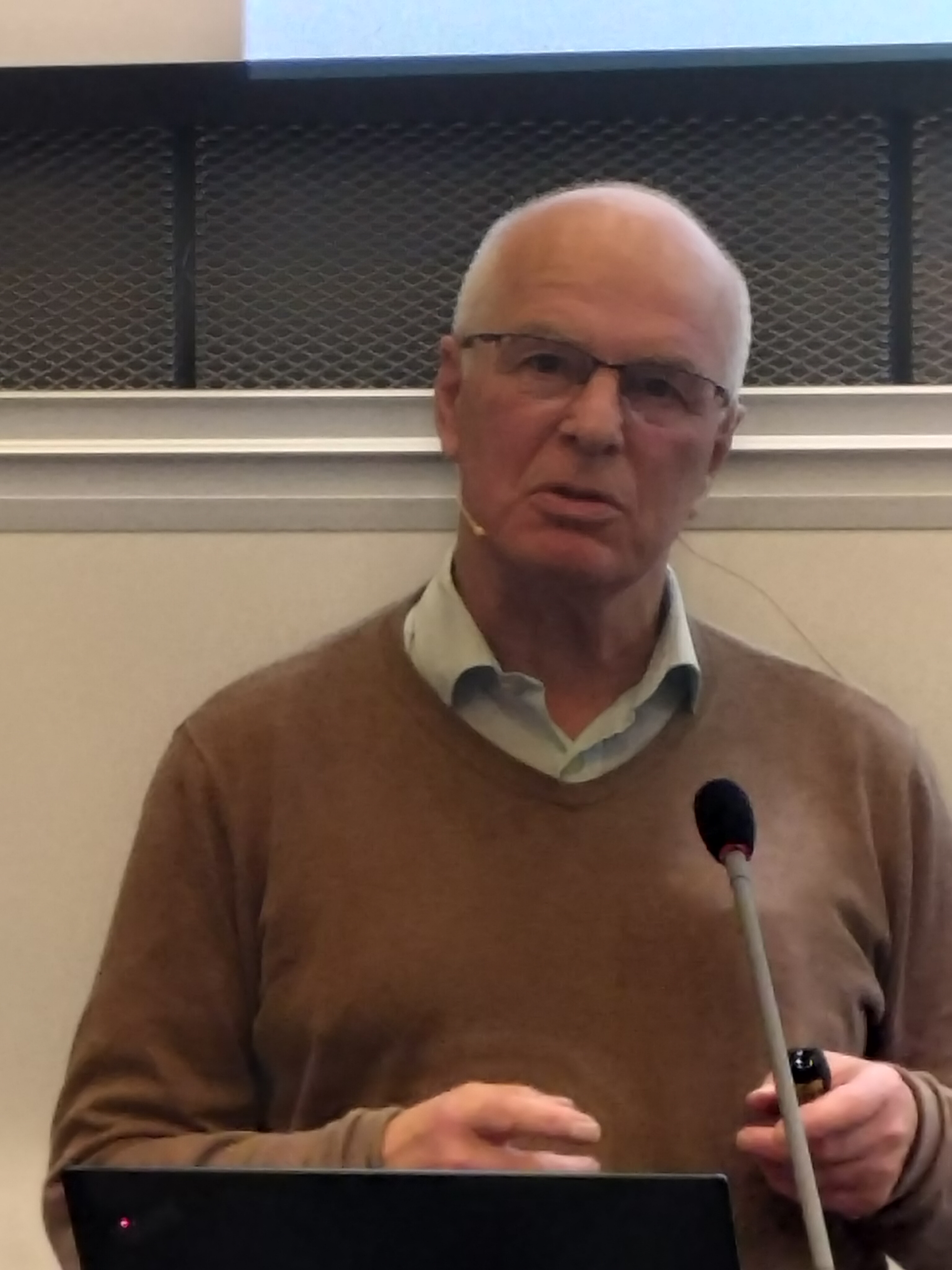
Ola Didrik Saugstad in 2025

There has long been a debate over whether newborn infants with birth asphyxia should be resuscitated with 100% oxygen or normal air. It has been demonstrated that high concentrations of oxygen lead to generation of oxygen free radicals, which have a role in reperfusion injury after asphyxia. Research by Ola Didrik Saugstad and others led to new international guidelines on newborn resuscitation in 2010, recommending the use of normal air instead of 100% oxygen. Increasing the oxygen concentration to the mother has shown little effect on the fetus as hyperoxygenated blood does not perfuse the placental exchange site well.

Underlying etiology of intrauterine hypoxia serves as a potential therapeutic target. If maternal preeclampsia is the underlying cause of fetal growth restriction (FGR) antihypertensive therapy and magnesium sulfate are potential therapies. Antihypertensive treatment is used to reduce blood pressure and prevent pulmonary edema and cerebral hemorrhages. An effective course of antihypertensive treatments should reduce blood pressure to below 160/110 mmHg. Magnesium sulfate acts as a vasodilator, reducing vascular resistance and protect the blood-brain barrier (BBB). The goal of these treatments is to prolong pregnancy and increase fetal survival. Each day gained by treatment in utero increases fetal survival and intact survival by 1%–2% up to 28 weeks gestation.

== Prevention ==
Medical testing and care can be performed in order to prevent intrauterine hypoxia, though can be difficult. These tests don't directly detect hypoxia, but instead detects the general well-being of the baby and ensures that the baby is healthy since hypoxia causes a wide range of responses. These tests can include prenatal testing, such as fetal movement and amniotic fluid levels, Doppler examination, or fetal heart rate. Another risk factor is premature birth in which medical intervention, such as premature birth prevention or C-section delivery, can be used as prevention for intrauterine hypoxia.

Studies have shown a connection between tetrahydrobiopterin (BH_{4}) deficiency and hypoxia-ischemia brain injury, though further studies need to be done. Measuring fetal BH_{4} levels can be another way to look out for intrauterine hypoxia.

During birth, birth asphyxia can occur in which cardiotocograph can be used to monitor the baby's health during labor.

== Epidemiology ==
In the United States, intrauterine hypoxia and birth asphyxia were listed together as the tenth leading cause of neonatal death.

== Society ==
IH/BA is also a causative factor in cardiac and circulatory birth defects the sixth most expensive condition, as well as premature birth and low birth weight the second most expensive and it is one of the contributing factors to infant respiratory distress syndrome (RDS) also known as hyaline membrane disease, the most expensive medical condition to treat and the number one cause of infant mortality.

Most expensive medical condition treated in U.S. hospitals. 4 out of 10 linked to intrauterine hypoxia/birth asphxia	Cost	Hospital Charge
1. Infant respiratory distress syndrome	$45,542	$138,224
2. Premature birth and low birth weight	$44,490	$119,389
6. Cardiac and circulatory birth defects	$35,960	$101,412
9. Intrauterine hypoxia or birth asphyxia	$27,962	$74,942

=== Medicolegal ===
In the United States the National Practitioner Data Bank 2006 Annual Report obstetrics-related cases accounted for 8.7 percent of all 2006 physician Malpractice Payment Reports and had the highest median payment amounts ($333,334).
