= HDV (disambiguation) =

HDV is a format for recording of high-definition video on DV cassette tape.

HDV may also refer to:

- Hepatitis delta virus, the infectious agent that causes Hepatitis D
- Hepatitis D Virus, another name for the hepatitis delta virus
- Hypertrophic decidual vasculopathy
- Jacky Jasper, a Canadian-American rapper also known as HDV, an acronym for "Higher Deeper Values."
