= Placental villous immaturity =

- Other names: Villous immaturity, villous dysmaturity
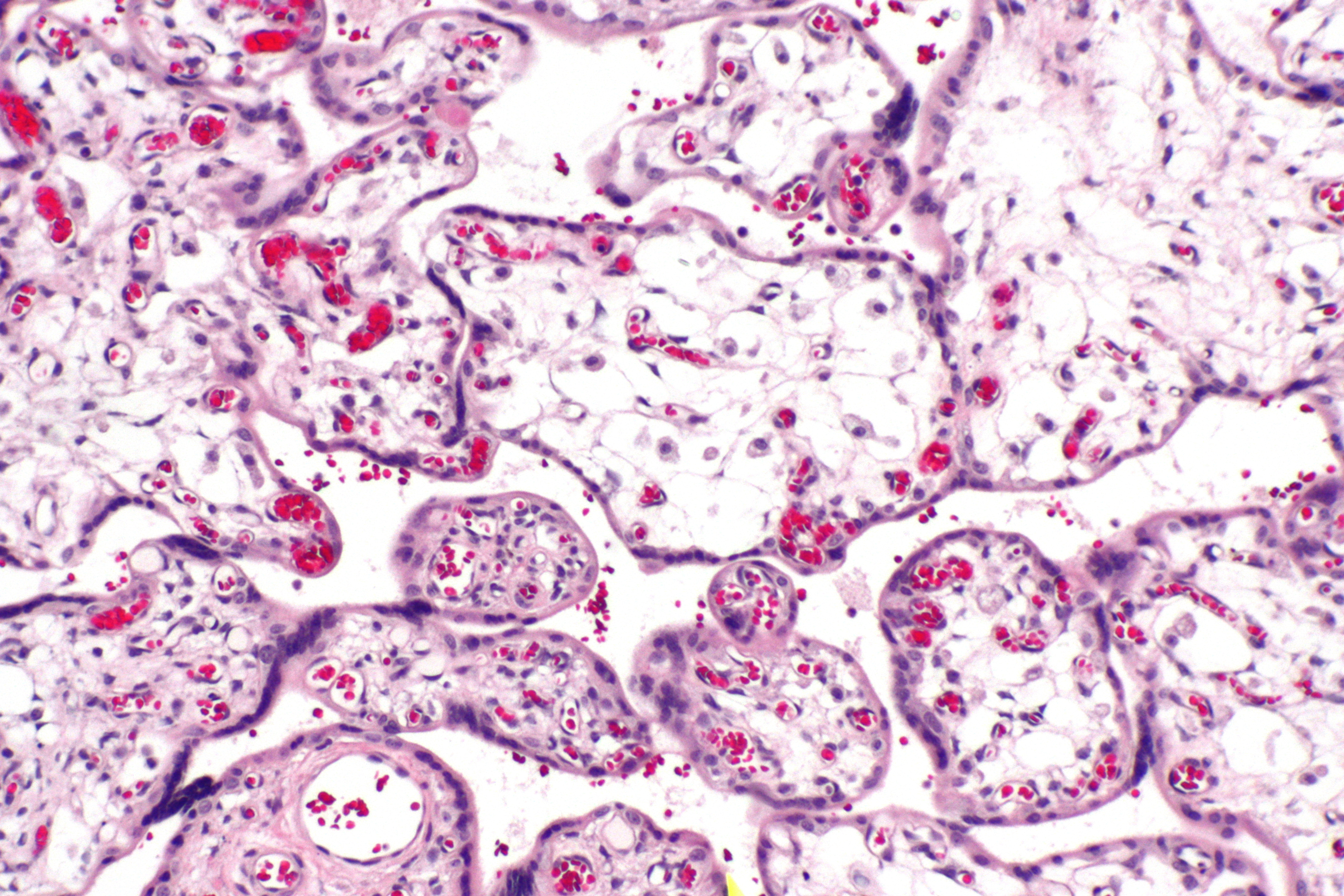
- Micrograph of villous immaturity. H&E stain.
- Specialty: Gynecology, pathology

Placental villous immaturity is chorionic villous development that is inappropriate for the gestational age.

It is associated with diabetes mellitus and fetal death near term, i.e. intrauterine demise close to the normal gestational period.

== Pathology ==
Immature chorionic villi are larger and have more central blood vessels; thus, the diffusion distance for gas and nutrient exchange is larger and, therefore, placental function is impaired.

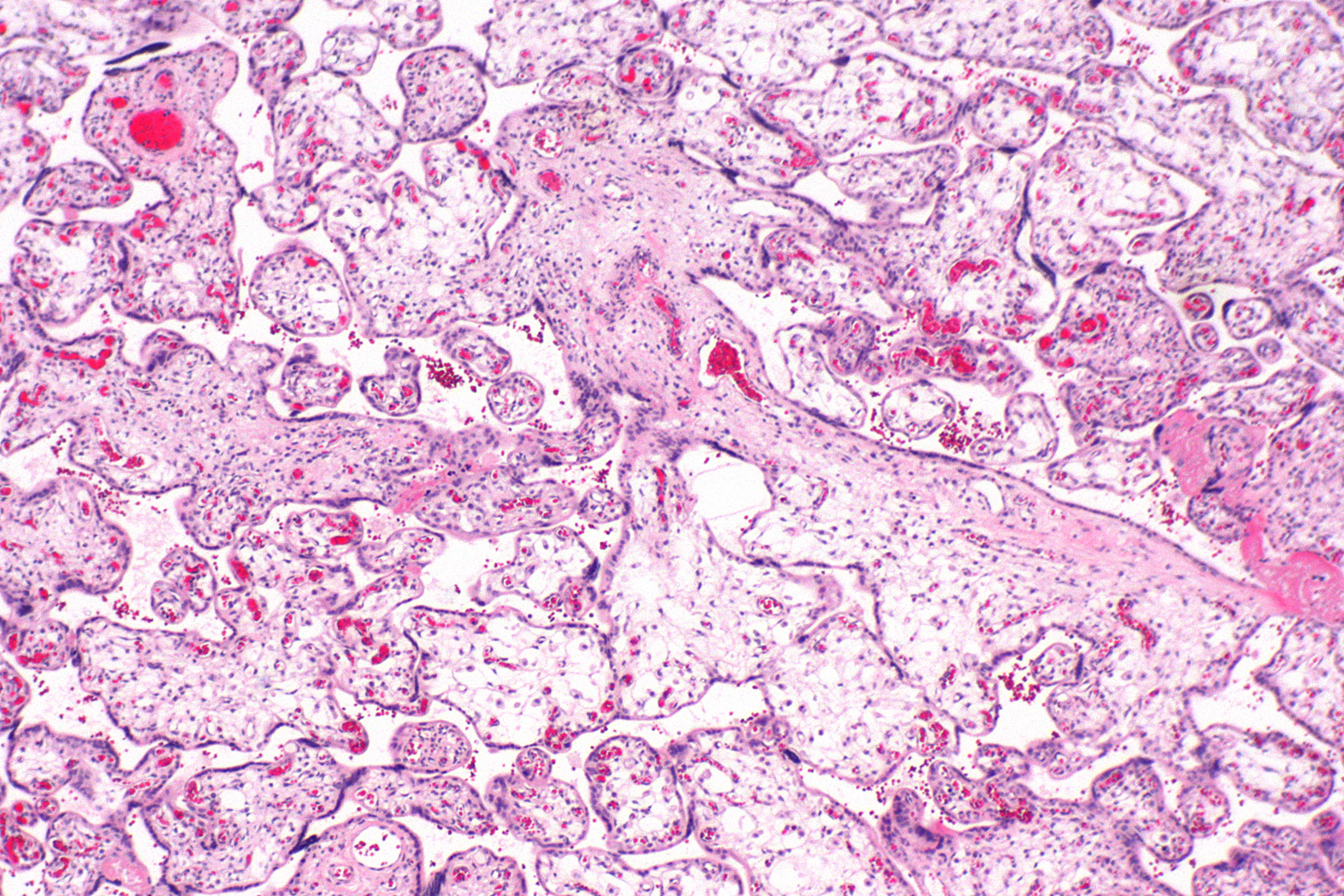
Low mag.

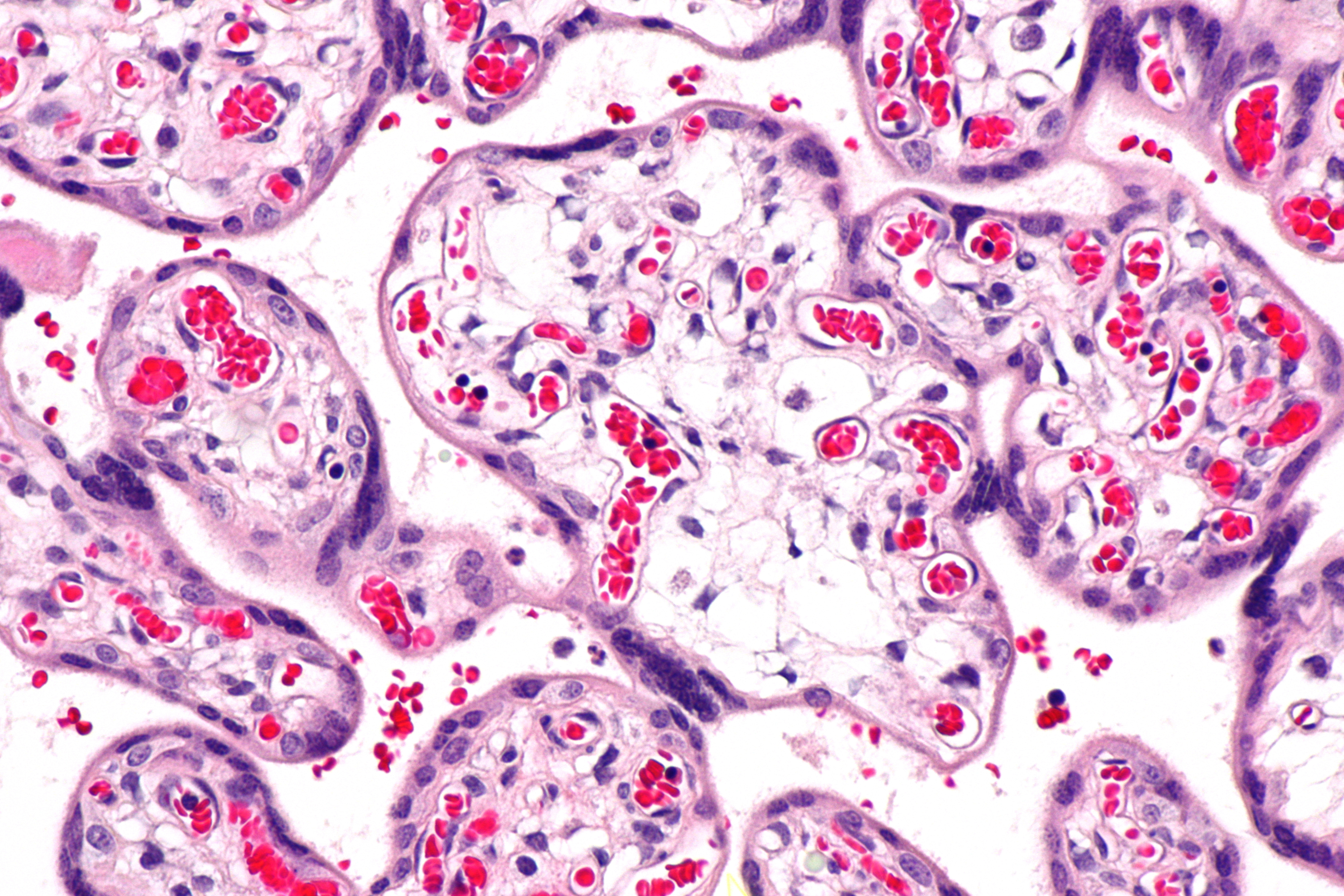
High mag.

== See also ==
- Placenta
- Placental pathology
