= Hypertensive disease of pregnancy =

- Other names: Maternal hypertensive disorder
- Specialty: Obstetrics
- Frequency: 20.7 million (2015)
- Deaths: 46,900 (2015)

Hypertensive disease of pregnancy, also known as maternal hypertensive disorder, is a group of high blood pressure disorders that include preeclampsia, preeclampsia superimposed on chronic hypertension, gestational hypertension, and chronic hypertension.

Maternal hypertensive disorders occurred in about 20.7 million women in 2013. About 10% of pregnancies globally are complicated by hypertensive diseases. In the United States, hypertensive disease of pregnancy affects about 8% to 13% of pregnancies. Rates have increased in the developing world. They resulted in 29,000 deaths in 2013, down from 37,000 deaths in 1990. They are one of the three major causes of death in pregnancy (16%) along with post partum bleeding (13%) and puerperal infections (2%).

Hypertensive disorders during pregnancy, such as gestational hypertension, preeclampsia, and eclampsia, are a major contributor to maternal and fetal illness and death on a worldwide scale. Around 5-10% of pregnancies are affected by these conditions, with preeclampsia being responsible for up to 14% of maternal deaths globally. The effects of HDP are significant, but there is still a limited understanding of its root causes. Studies show an interconnection of genetic, immunological, and environmental elements. Accurately pinpointing particular risk factors has stifled researchers because of the varied nature of Hypertensive disorders of pregnancy. All types of HDP can be caused by a variety of factors, as mentioned above, and can occur in irregular manners.

== Signs and symptoms ==
Although many pregnant women with high blood pressure have healthy babies without serious problems, high blood pressure can be dangerous for both the mother and baby. Women with pre-existing, or chronic, high blood pressure are more likely to have certain complications during pregnancy than those with normal blood pressure. However, some women develop high blood pressure while they are pregnant (often called gestational hypertension).

Chronic poorly-controlled high blood pressure before and during pregnancy puts a pregnant woman and her baby at risk for problems. It is associated with an increased risk for maternal complications, such as pre-eclampsia, placental abruption (when the placenta separates from the wall of the uterus), and gestational diabetes. These women also face a higher risk for poor birth outcomes such as pre-term delivery, having an infant small for his/her gestational age, and infant death.

== Risk factors ==
Some women have a greater risk of developing hypertension during pregnancy. These are:

- Women with chronic hypertension (high blood pressure before becoming pregnant).
- Women who developed high blood pressure or preeclampsia during a previous pregnancy, especially if these conditions occurred early in the pregnancy.
- Women who are obese before pregnancy.
- Pregnant women under the age of 15 or over the age of 30.
- Women who are pregnant with more than one baby.
- Women with diabetes, kidney disease, rheumatoid arthritis, lupus, or scleroderma.
- Woman who use artificial reproductive technologies

== Diagnosis ==
There is no single test to predict or diagnose preeclampsia. Key signs are increased blood pressure and protein in the urine (proteinuria). Other symptoms that seem to occur with preeclampsia include persistent headaches, blurred vision or sensitivity to light, and abdominal pain.

Other disorders can cause all of these sensations; they can also occur in healthy pregnancies. Regular visits are scheduled to track blood pressure and protein levels in urine, to order and analyze blood tests that detect signs of preeclampsia, and to monitor fetal development more closely.

=== Classification ===
A classification of hypertensive disorders of pregnancy uses 4 categories as recommended by the U.S. National High Blood Pressure Education Program Working Group on High Blood Pressure in Pregnancy:

1. Chronic hypertension;
2. Preeclampsia-eclampsia;
3. Preeclampsia superimposed on chronic hypertension;
4. Gestational hypertension (transient hypertension of pregnancy or chronic hypertension identified in the latter half of pregnancy).

This terminology is preferred over the older but widely used term pregnancy-induced hypertension (PIH) because it is more precise. The newer terminology reflects simply relation of pregnancy with either the onset or first detection of hypertension; the question of causation, while pathogenetically interesting, is not the important point for most health care purposes. This classification treats HELLP syndrome as a type of preeclampsia rather than a parallel entity.

=== Chronic hypertension ===
Chronic hypertension is a type of high blood pressure in a pregnant woman that is pre-existing before conception, diagnosed early in pregnancy, or persists significantly after the end of pregnancy. It affects about 5% of all pregnancies and can be a primary disorder of essential hypertension or secondary to another condition; it is not caused by pregnancy itself.

The diagnostic criteria for chronic hypertension are typically considered to be at least two separate blood pressure readings taken at least four hours apart with systolic blood pressure ≥ 140mmHg, diastolic blood pressure ≥90 mmHg, or both, identified before pregnancy, before 20 weeks of gestation, or persisting at least 12 weeks after giving birth. However, there is some controversy over the utility of adopting lower thresholds for the diagnosis of chronic hypertension, which is more consistent with recent recommendations from the American College of Cardiology and the American Heart Association for the diagnosis of hypertension in adults. Chronic hypertension in pregnancy is now considered mild if blood pressures do not exceed 159 mmHg systolic and 109 mmHg diastolic and severe if pressures are ≥ 160 mmHg systolic or 110 mmHg diastolic, although controversy also exists as to the most appropriate cutoffs for this definition.

Because chronic hypertension can progress to more severe forms of disease, it is important to accurately diagnose the condition early, ideally before pregnancy, and initiate management to control parental blood pressure. This is often difficult, as many reproductive individuals may not regularly visit the doctor and, when pregnant, may initially present for prenatal care in the second trimester.

=== Pre-eclampsia and eclampsia ===
Preeclampsia is a medical condition which usually develops after 20 weeks of gestation and traditionally involves both newly increased blood pressure (blood pressure > 140/90 mmHg) and proteinuria. Importantly, preeclampsia can first develop after delivery, even in those who had normal blood pressure throughout their pregnancy.

Preeclampsia is a leading cause of fetal complications, which include low birth weight, preterm birth, and stillbirth. Women with preeclampsia are encouraged to deliver the child after 37 weeks of gestation to minimize the risks of severe complications.

Preeclampsia, the most severe type of HDP, has been a major subject of research for scientists. Preeclampsia is usually characterized by elevated blood pressure and frequently protein in the urine after the 20th week of pregnancy, believed to be caused by abnormal placental growth leading to endothelial dysfunction and inflammation. Nevertheless, the order of these occurrences is still debated, making targeted treatment strategies more challenging. Furthermore, preventive measures are delayed because current criteria only show evidence in the second or third trimesters.

Recent studies have identified important biomarkers linked to HDP, such as placental growth factor. Unusual levels of this angiogenic factor and others have shown potential for forecasting preeclampsia, which could enable earlier intervention and improved monitoring. Furthermore, scientists are studying lifestyle factors such as diet and physical activity to evaluate their potential to reduce HDP risk, although definitive conclusions have not yet been reached.

Preeclampsia can also be diagnosed if a woman has both increased blood pressure and 1 or more signs of significant organ damage. Signs of significant organ damage include:

- Severely elevated blood pressure (blood pressure > 160/110)
- Thrombocytopenia
- Increased or rapidly elevating levels of creatinine in the blood
- Increased liver enzymes
- Pulmonary edema
- New or persistent headaches that do not respond to pain medication
- Blurred or altered vision

If a woman with preeclampsia has any of these signs of significant organ damage, then her condition is classified as preeclampsia with severe features. This diagnosis can be made even if the patient does not have proteinuria. Women with preeclampsia with severe features are encouraged to deliver the child after 34 weeks of gestation to minimize the risks of severe complications.

Preeclampsia can also present with seizures in the pregnant mother. In this case, the patient would be diagnosed with eclampsia.

There is no proven way to prevent preeclampsia/eclampsia. Most women who develop signs of preeclampsia, however, are closely monitored to lessen or avoid related problems. The only way to "cure" preeclampsia/eclampsia is to deliver or abort the baby.

==== Eclampsia ====
Eclampsia is one particularly concerning form of preeclampsia in which a pregnant woman who previously presented with signs of newly increased blood pressure begins to experience new generalized seizures or coma. Up to 70% of patients with eclampsia experience complications associated with pregnancy. These complications can include HELLP syndrome, acute kidney injury, and disseminated intravascular coagulation among others.

==== HELLP Syndrome ====
HELLP syndrome is a type of preeclampsia with severe features that involve increased hemolysis, increased liver enzymes, and low platelet levels. While most women with HELLP syndrome have high blood pressure and proteinuria, up to 20% of HELLP syndrome cases do not present with these classical signs of preeclampsia. However, like pre-eclampsia, HELLP syndrome can also lead to low birth weight and premature birth of the fetus/neonate. HELLP syndrome has a fetal/neonatal mortality rate of 7-20%.

=== Preeclampsia superimposed on chronic hypertension ===
Preeclampsia superimposed on chronic hypertension occurs when a pregnant woman with chronic hypertension develops signs of pre-eclampsia, typically defined as new onset of proteinuria ≥30 mg/dL (1+ in the dipstick) in at least 2 random urine specimens that were collected ≥4 h apart (but within a 7-day interval) or 0.3 g in a 24-h period. Like ordinary pre-eclampsia, superimposed pre-eclampsia can also occur with severe features, which are defined as: systolic blood pressure ≥160 mmHg or diastolic blood pressure ≥110 mmHg despite escalation of antihypertensive therapy; thrombocytopenia (platelet count <100,000/microL); impaired liver function; new-onset or worsening renal insufficiency; pulmonary edema; or persistent cerebral or visual disturbances. As a result, superimposed pre-eclampsia can be diagnosed without proteinuria when a sudden increase in previously well-controlled blood pressure is accompanied by severe features of pre-eclampsia.

=== Gestational hypertension ===
Gestational hypertension is a provisional diagnosis that involves newly increased blood pressure in a pregnant woman that usually develops after 20 weeks of gestation but does not currently show any signs of proteinuria or other features associated with preeclampsia. Up to 50% of gestational hypertension patients go on to develop some form of preeclampsia.

Gestational hypertension will normally resolve by 12 weeks postpartum. In this case, the diagnosis of gestational hypertension will be updated to be transient hypertension of pregnancy. If the increased blood pressure does not resolve by 12 weeks postpartum, then the diagnosis of gestational hypertension will be updated to be chronic hypertension. At home blood pressure measurements have been documented to be a possible way to improve rates of early detection of hypertension in postpartum patients.

== Prevention ==
Blood pressure control can be accomplished before pregnancy. Medications can control blood pressure. Certain medications may not be ideal for blood pressure control during pregnancy, such as angiotensin-converting enzyme (ACE) inhibitors and angiotensin II (AII) receptor antagonists. Controlling weight gain during pregnancy can help reduce the risk of hypertension during pregnancy.

There is limited evidence to suggest that calcium supplementation may reduce the risk of pre-eclampsia or stillbirth but it is unclear if it has other benefits.

Current research is focused on enhancing early identification, exploring genetic and environmental factors, and creating novel therapies. Improving maternal and fetal health outcomes globally could be greatly enhanced by addressing these disparities in HDP.

== Management ==
The only way to definitively treat a hypertensive disease of pregnancy (i.e., preeclampsia/eclampsia, gestational hypertension, etc. ) is to deliver the fetus. This prevents further development of complications related to the disorder in both the mother and the fetus. Therefore, the first-line approach to management of these conditions is to consider induction of preterm labor. The exact timing of when to induce labor is dependent on the severity of symptoms related to the hypertensive disease, as well as the medical condition of both the mother and the fetus. Generally, in mothers with preeclampsia, labor is induced once the gestational age is >37 weeks. In patients with preeclampsia with severe features or eclampsia, labor is induced once the gestational age is >34 weeks. In patients with gestational hypertension and no other signs of severe disease, labor is generally induced at term.

In cases where the fetus has not yet reached a safe gestational age to be delivered, management is focused on managing symptoms to give the fetus more time to mature. In women with gestational hypertension, some studies have found that usage of baby aspirin can prevent the progression of the condition to preeclampsia/eclampsia and reduce the risk of complications associated with hypertensive disorders of pregnancy.

Pregnant women with chronic hypertension diagnosed before or early in pregnancy should be evaluated to identify the underlying cause of hypertension as well as possible existing end-organ damage caused by hypertension, such as cardiac and kidney injury. Although most cases of chronic hypertension are primary, and thus classified as essential hypertension, secondary causes such as renal, vascular, and endocrine disorders must also be considered, especially in patients with chronic hypertension presenting abnormally, for instance, at a young age or refractory to first-line treatment. If end-organ damage or an underlying cause of hypertension is identified, these conditions must also be treated. Women with chronic hypertension in pregnancy must be closely monitored because they are five times as likely as those with normal blood pressure to develop pre-eclampsia, which is a much more severe condition with serious risks for the mother and fetus.

For all hypertensive disorders of pregnancy, a major component of care is management of the associated hypertension. This involves the use of antihypertensive medication as well as restricting activity to lower blood pressure to reduce the risk of stroke. In women with preeclampsia or eclampsia, magnesium sulfate is often prescribed to prevent the occurrence of seizures in the gestational parent. Shorter duration of treatment with magnesium sulfate has high significance of evidence of reducing duration of urinary catheterization and time to ambulation, but there is insufficient evidence to show that reducing the length of treatment impacts the risk of seizures, maternal, or infant morbidities. Lower dose magnesium sulfate regimens may reduce rates of overdose, but there is low significance of evidence that it increases the risk of seizures in patients with eclampsia or mortality in patients with eclampsia.

Treatment should be continued from the time of diagnosis to several weeks postpartum, given the increased risk of medical complications immediately following delivery of the fetus. A recent systematic review found that postpartum home blood pressure monitoring likely improves the determination of blood pressure measures and overall patient of these conditions. Additionally, home blood pressure monitoring lessens physical and financial barriers to blood pressure surveillance, likely decreasing health disparities between black and non-black patients.

While there is no known cure for hypertensive disorders in pregnant women other than to deliver the baby, there are studies with treatments that have been shown to manage hypertension in pregnant women, because delivering a baby too early can lead to other complications. According to an article from the New England Journal of Medicine, antihypertensive therapies have been shown to reduce the risk of severe hypertension while pregnant and to reduce the number of other potential outcomes that can happen as a result of severe gestational hypertension. The goal of the treatment from this experiment was for the group receiving the treatment to reach a blood pressure below 140/90 mm Hg. This experiment showed that the group receiving the treatment had lower blood pressure and better pregnancy outcomes compared to the group that was not receiving no treatment.

Low-dose calcium supplementation has shown some evidence that it could reduce the risk of outcomes that can come from gestational hypertension. Specifically, it has been shown to reduce the risk of death, severe preeclampsia, and eclampsia. Calcium supplementation can especially benefit women who are not getting enough calcium in their daily diet.

A study examined the effects of the three most common oral antihypertensive drugs: nifedipine, labetalol, and methyldopa. The outcome of this study was that most women showed reduced blood pressure and experienced no adverse effects across all three groups. However, nifedipine showed the greatest effect at 6 hours, but it also had the highest rate of ICU admissions. More research is needed on these oral antihypertensive drugs to determine which one is the best for most pregnant women. Additionally, a study done in 2023 demonstrated that treatment of patients with oral diuretic furosemide, a loop diuretic, may decrease the length of hypertension postpartum. More research regarding other antihypertensive treatment options is needed to establish their therapeutic benefit and potential adverse effects in the management of hypertension in postpartum patients.

== Prognosis ==
The effects of high blood pressure during pregnancy vary depending on the disorder and other factors. Preeclampsia does not, in general, increase a woman's risk for developing chronic hypertension or other heart-related problems. Women with normal blood pressure who develop preeclampsia after the 20th week of their first pregnancy have short-term complications, including increased blood pressure, which usually go away within about six weeks after delivery. Some patients may experience persistent hypertension into the postpartum period.

Women who have chronic hypertension before their pregnancy are at increased risk of complications such as premature birth, low birthweight, or stillbirth. Women who have high blood pressure and had complications in their pregnancy have three times the risk of developing cardiovascular disease compared to women with normal blood pressure who had no complications in pregnancy. Monitoring pregnant women's blood pressure can help prevent both complications and future cardiovascular diseases.

Even though high blood pressure and related disorders during pregnancy can be serious, most women with high blood pressure and those who develop preeclampsia have successful pregnancies. Obtaining early and regular prenatal care for pregnant women is important to identify and treat blood pressure disorders. Monitoring blood pressure can help catch postpartum hypertension early and might even help with racial disparities in follow-up care.

== Epidemiology ==
High blood pressure problems occur in six percent to eight percent of all pregnancies in the U.S., about 70 percent of which are first-time pregnancies. In 1998, more than 146,320 cases of preeclampsia alone were diagnosed.

Although the proportion of pregnancies with gestational hypertension and eclampsia has remained about the same in the U.S. over the past decade, the rate of preeclampsia has increased by nearly one-third. This increase is due in part to a rise in the number of older mothers and of multiple births, where preeclampsia occurs more frequently. For example, in 1998, birth rates among women ages 30 to 44 and the number of births to women ages 45 and older were at the highest levels in three decades, according to the National Center for Health Statistics. Furthermore, between 1980 and 1998, rates of twin births increased about 50 percent overall and 1,000 percent among women ages 45 to 49; rates of triplet and other higher-order multiple births jumped more than 400 percent overall, and 1,000 percent among women in their 40s.
