= Chorioangioma =

- Other names: Placental hemangioma
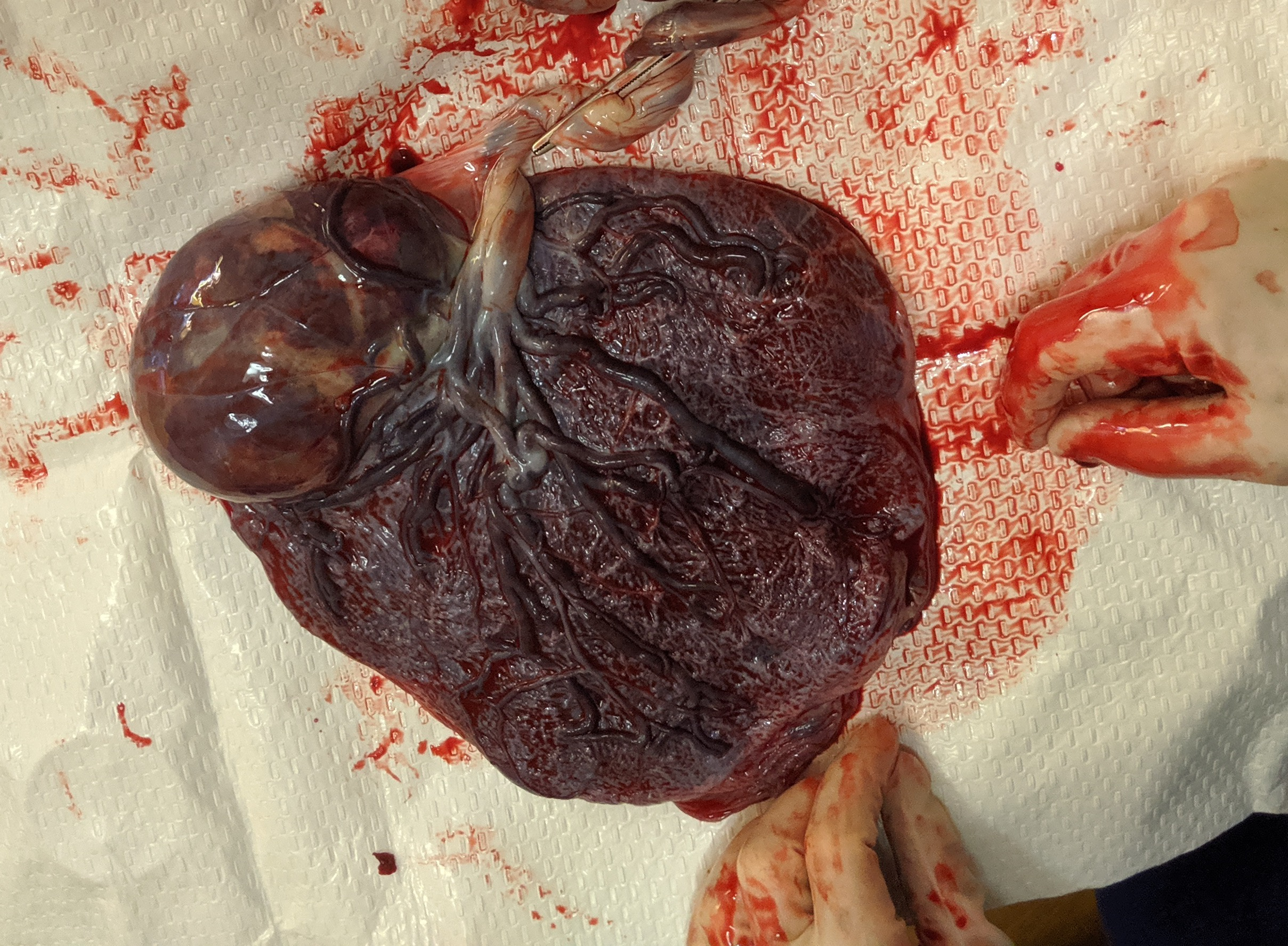
- Placenta with an especially large 10cm chorioangioma

Chorioangioma, or chorangioma, is a benign tumor of placenta. It is a hamartoma-like growth in the placenta consisting of blood vessels, and is seen in approximately 0.5 to 1% pregnancies. It is mostly diagnosed ultrasonically in the second trimester of pregnancy. Large chorioangiomas are known to cause complications in pregnancy, while the smaller ones are asymptomatic.

== Presentation ==
Most chorangiomas are not clinically significant, i.e. they do not have an adverse effect on placental function.

=== Complications ===
Large (greater than 4 or 5 cm.) or multiple chorioangiomas may lead to complication. The complications are polyhydramnios, preterm labour, hemolytic anemia, fetal cardiomegaly, fetal thrombocytopenia, intrauterine growth retardation, preeclampsia, abruption of placenta and congenital anomalies.

== Pathogenesis ==
The origin of chorioangioma is from primitive chorionic mesenchyme. It develops when the blood vessels and stroma undergo rapid proliferation independent of the surrounding tissue. Based on histological features, chorioangioma is classified by Marchetti into three types:

- Cellular type : This type is immature and contains mostly cellular elements packed compactly.
- Angiomatous (vascular) type : This is the most common type of choriocarcinoma. It is distinguished by the presence of numerous small blood vessels.
- Degenerative type : This is the mature type with degenerative changes.

Each type is believed to represent a phase of tumor development. Chorioangioma has no malignant potential.

== Diagnosis ==
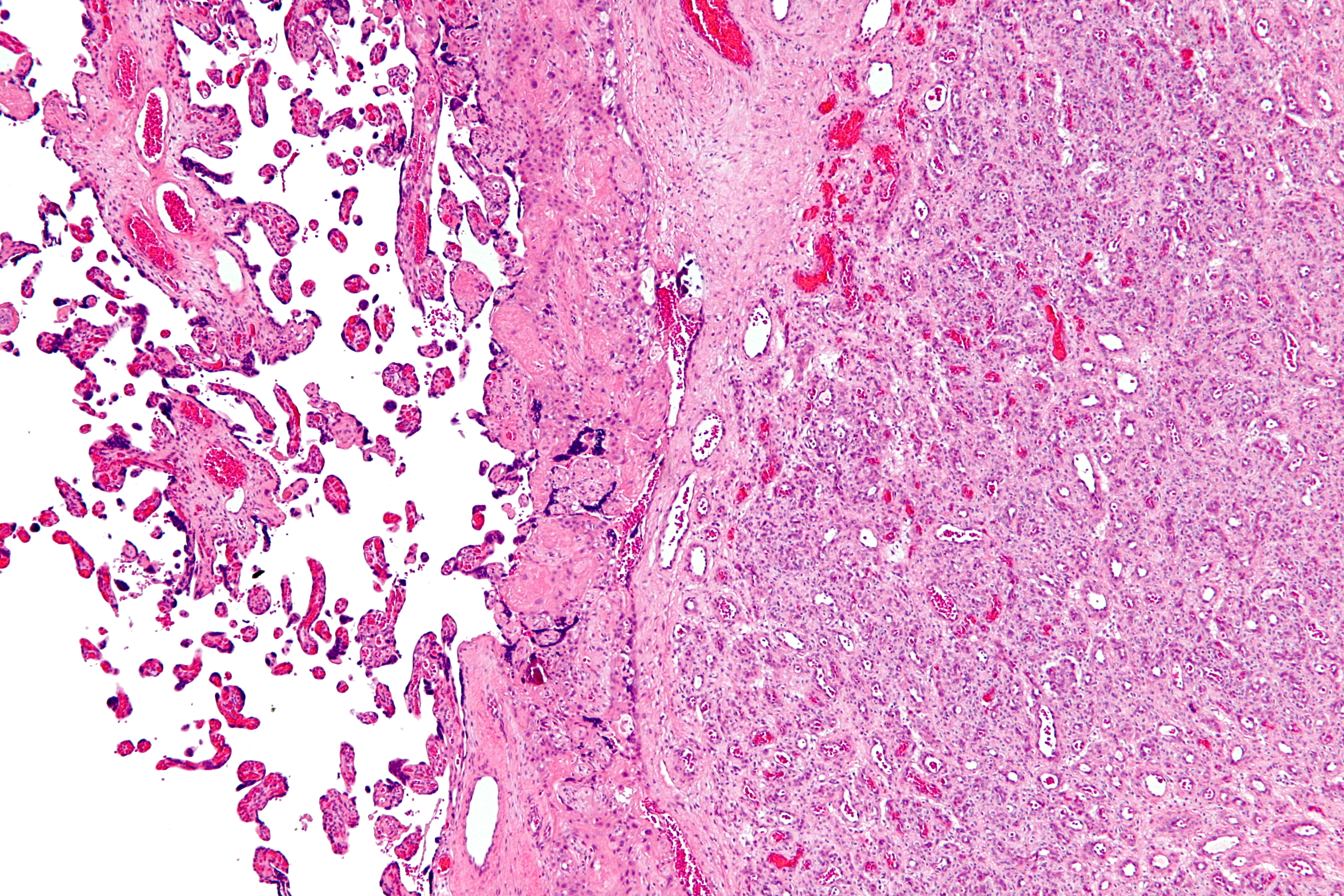
Micrograph of a chorangioma (right of image) and normal placenta (left of image); H&E stain.

Most chorioangiomas are asymptomatic. They are generally picked up in second trimester scan. Chorioangioma is seen as a hypo- or hyperechoic circumscribed mass that is distinct from the placenta at gray-scale US examination. Large lesions may contain fibrous septa. It is seen protruding into the amniotic cavity near the insertion of the cord. Doppler examination shows anechoic cystic areas, with pulsatile flow in spectral analysis. Some chorioangiomas may be solid masses, and may not be identifiable in gray-scale imaging. Therefore, the investigation of choice is Colour Doppler, which also distinguishes it from placental hematoma.

They can also be detected with MRI.

Histologically, chorioangiomas consist of abundant vascular channels and may be cellular.

== Management ==
Expectant management is recommended for chorioangioma as majority of them are asymptomatic. Large tumors are monitored with ultrasonogram every 1–2 weeks. In case of maternal or foetal complications, possible interventions are serial foetal transfusions, fetoscopic laser coagulation of vessels supplying the tumor, endoscopic surgical devascularization and chemosclerosis using absolute alcohol.

== Prognosis ==
Large chorioangiomas with decreased echogenicity, decreased tumor volume and decreased blood flow in colour doppler images are may undergo spontaneous infarction. When chorioangiomas have deceased blood flow, fetal hemodynamics and clinical outcome are found to be improved.

== Epidemiology ==
It is the most common tumor of the placenta. Chorioangiomas over the size of 5 cm in diameter are rare, and occur at a rate of 1:3500 to 1:16,000 births. Smaller chorioangiomas are more frequent, with an incidence of 14‑139:10,000 births. However, many small chorioangiomas may not be sonologically visible and hence go unreported. In a clinical study, more than half of all tumors were discovered only by histological techniques.

== History ==
Chorioangioma was first described by Clarke in 1798.

== See also ==
- Hemangioma
- Chorangiosis
