= Villitis of unknown etiology =

- Other names: Chronic villitis
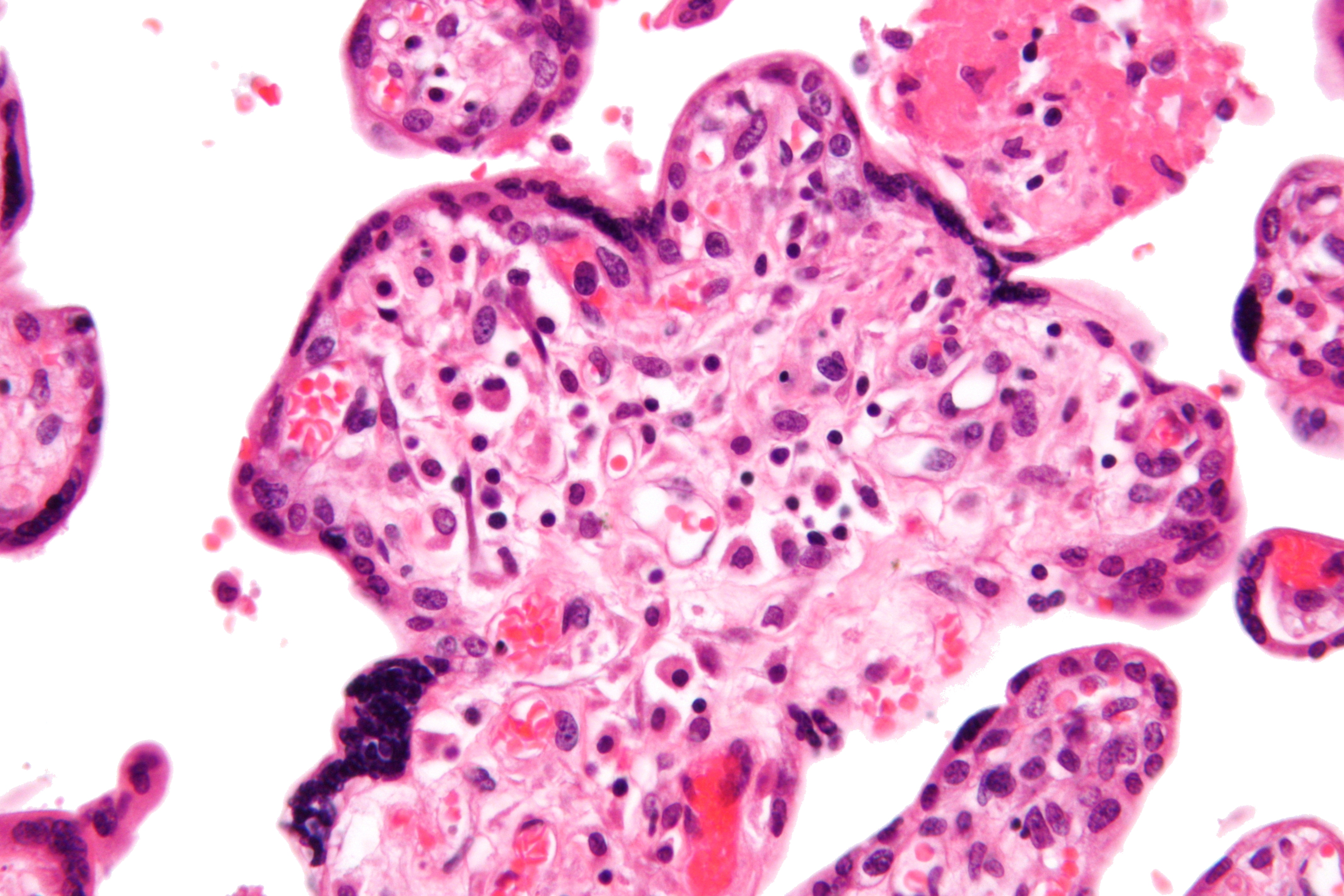
- Micrograph of villitis of unknown etiology. H&E stain.
- Specialty: Pathology, gynecology

Villitis of unknown etiology (VUE), also known as chronic villitis, is a placental injury. VUE is an inflammatory condition involving the chorionic villi (placental villi). VUE is a recurrent condition and can be associated with intrauterine growth restriction (IUGR). IUGR involves the poor growth of the foetus, stillbirth, miscarriage, and premature delivery. VUE recurs in about 1/3 of subsequent pregnancies.

VUE is a common lesion characterised by inflammation in the placental chorionic villi. VUE is also characterised by the transfer of maternal lymphocytes across the placenta.

VUE is diagnosed in 7–10% placentas in pregnancies. Roughly 80% of the VUE cases are in term placentas (greater than 37 weeks of pregnancy). A case of VUE in a placenta less than 32 weeks old should be screened for infectious villitis.

== Pathogenesis ==
Inflammatory cells of maternal origin could access the foetal villous stoma in multiple ways:

The villous trophoblast barrier could be damaged. In the third trimester, syncytial knots (nucleated clusters formed in the syncytiotrophoblast) break off and are shed from the foetal placental villi. The shedding can strip the villous stroma. The barrier could breakdown either by upstream foetal thrombosis or ischemic damage from maternal infarction. The necrosis of syncytiotrophoblasts could arise as a result of the activation of coagulation components, complement system or platelets by antibodies or antiphospholipids.

Syncytiotrophoblasts can be made to exhibit adhesion molecules (intracellular adhesion molecule 1, E-selectin) in VUE, although in normal conditions adhesion molecules are not expressed.

Maternal lymphocytes can enter the foetal stroma by passing the villous trophoblastic barrier via the anchoring villi. The anchoring villi lose their layer of continuous epithelial syncytiotrophoblast as the villi mature into invasive intermediate trophoblasts through the developmental course of the placenta. A trophic factor, IL-15, for CD8+ memory T-cells is expressed by decidual stromal cells. The trafficking of maternal lymphocytes responding to an antigen in the chronic deciduitis could activate and enter via the decidua.

VUE is a T-cell mediated, CD8+ dominating inflammatory reaction. VUE develops in the foetal fibrovasculature stroma of the placenta villi usually towards the end of pregnancy (term placentas). The lymphocytes in VUE are of maternal origin. VUE is a host-derived inflammatory response happening within a donor allograft tissue. The non-T-cell component of the inflammatory infiltrate originates both from the maternal and placental side. Majority of the antigen-presenting cells were Hofbauer cells (macrophages) were of foetal origin. Perivillous monocyte-macrophages and histiocytic giant cells were of maternal origin. Foetal macrophages in VUE proliferate and are activated as a result of the up-regulation of MHC class 2 antigen expression. Examination of a male placenta with VUE demonstrated that 11.2% of the intravillous CD3+ lymphocytes were foetal, and 88.8% were maternal. Macrophages, intervillous lymphocytes, multinucleated giant cells were maternal; 10.5% of intravillous CD68+ cells and 96.4% of perivillous CD68+ cells were maternal. Lymphocytes were predominantly maternal T-cells. Maternal cells can enter the placental villi and the foetus as well.

== Diagnosis ==
VUE can be of 2 types, low grade chronic villitis or high grade chronic villitis. Low grade chronic villitis involves less than 10 villi containing lymphocytes. Low grade chronic villitis can be either focal or multifocal. Focal has involved villi on only one glass slide, while multifocal has involved villi on at least two slides. High grade chronic villitis has more than 10 inflamed villi per focus. High grade chronic villitis is differentiated into diffuse and patchy. The term patchy is used if less than 30% of distal villi are involved. The term diffuse is used if more than 30% of distal villi are involved.

VUE has 2 prominent distinct patterns. Approximately 50% of the cases only involve the distal villi (mature intermediate and terminal villi) and do not involve the proximal stem villi, the anchoring villi embedded in the basal plate, and the chorionic plate. The second most common pattern (roughly 30% of VUE cases) involves the proximal stem villi (and possibly the chorionic plate) and the distal villi usually. This type of VUE is linked with foetal vascular obtrusive lesions (Obliterative Foetal Vasculopathy).

VUE does not have specific clinical signs and symptoms suggesting diagnosis; but an analysis of the inflammatory filtrate can aid in diagnosis. The composition of inflammatory infiltrate in VUE on a cellular level is primarily macrophages and lymphocytes. The relative proportions of cells vary case by case. The lymphocytes present in VUE are predominantly CD8+ T-cells then CD4. There is usually a ratio of 0.1 to 0.5 for CD4/CD8. The macrophages present are mainly Mac387-, followed by CD68 and HAM56+. Class 2 major histocompatibility complex (MHC) antigens on macrophages are up-regulated at sites of VUE. Neutrophils should not be present at sites of VUE. VUE is a condition involving inflammation and not infection. High numbers of neutrophils are present in infectious villitis and not VUE.

=== Histopathology ===
Histomorphologically, VUE is characterized by a lymphocytic infiltrate of the chorionic villi without a demonstrable cause. Plasma cells should be absent; the presence of plasma cells suggests an infective etiology, e.g. CMV infection.

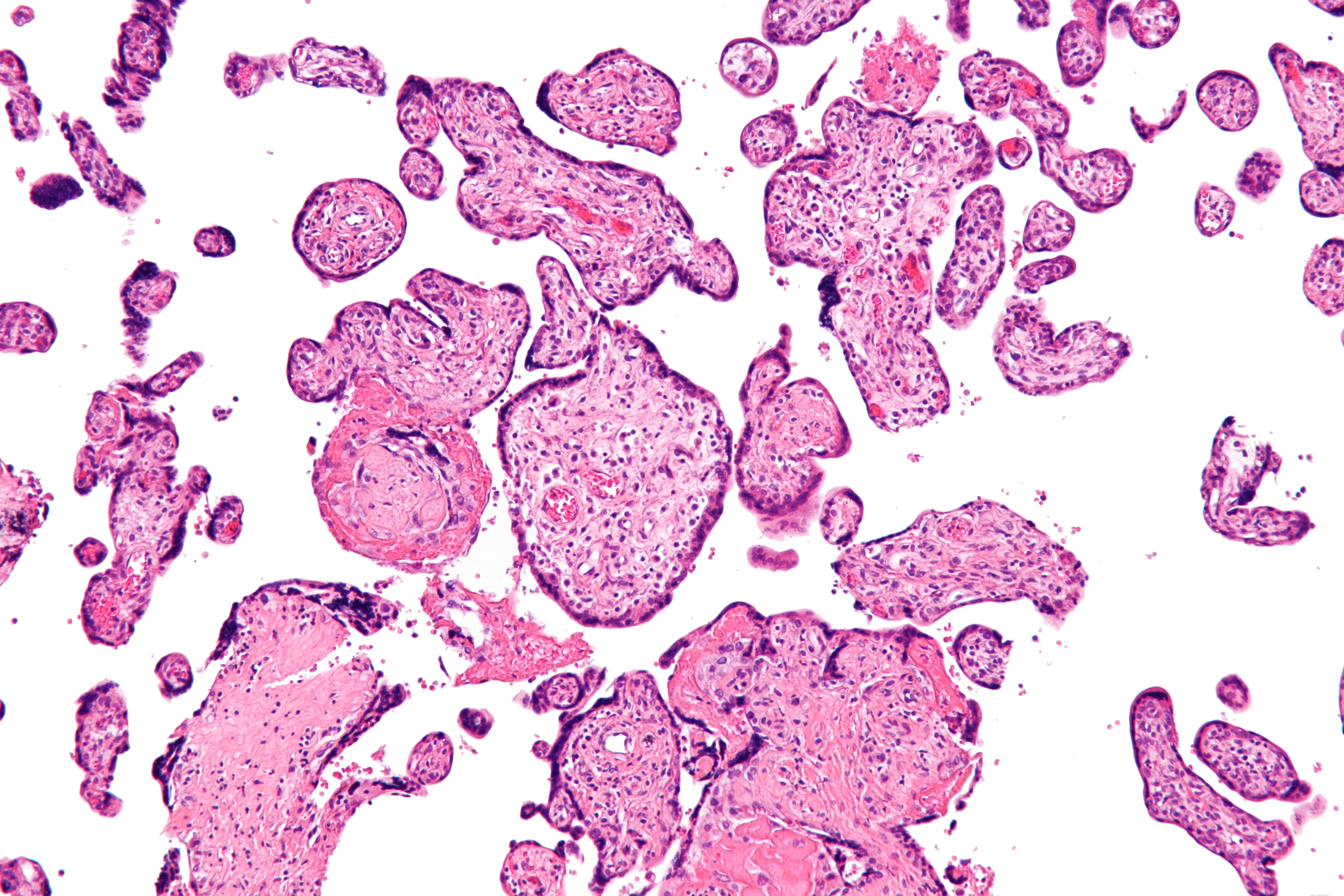
Intermed. mag.

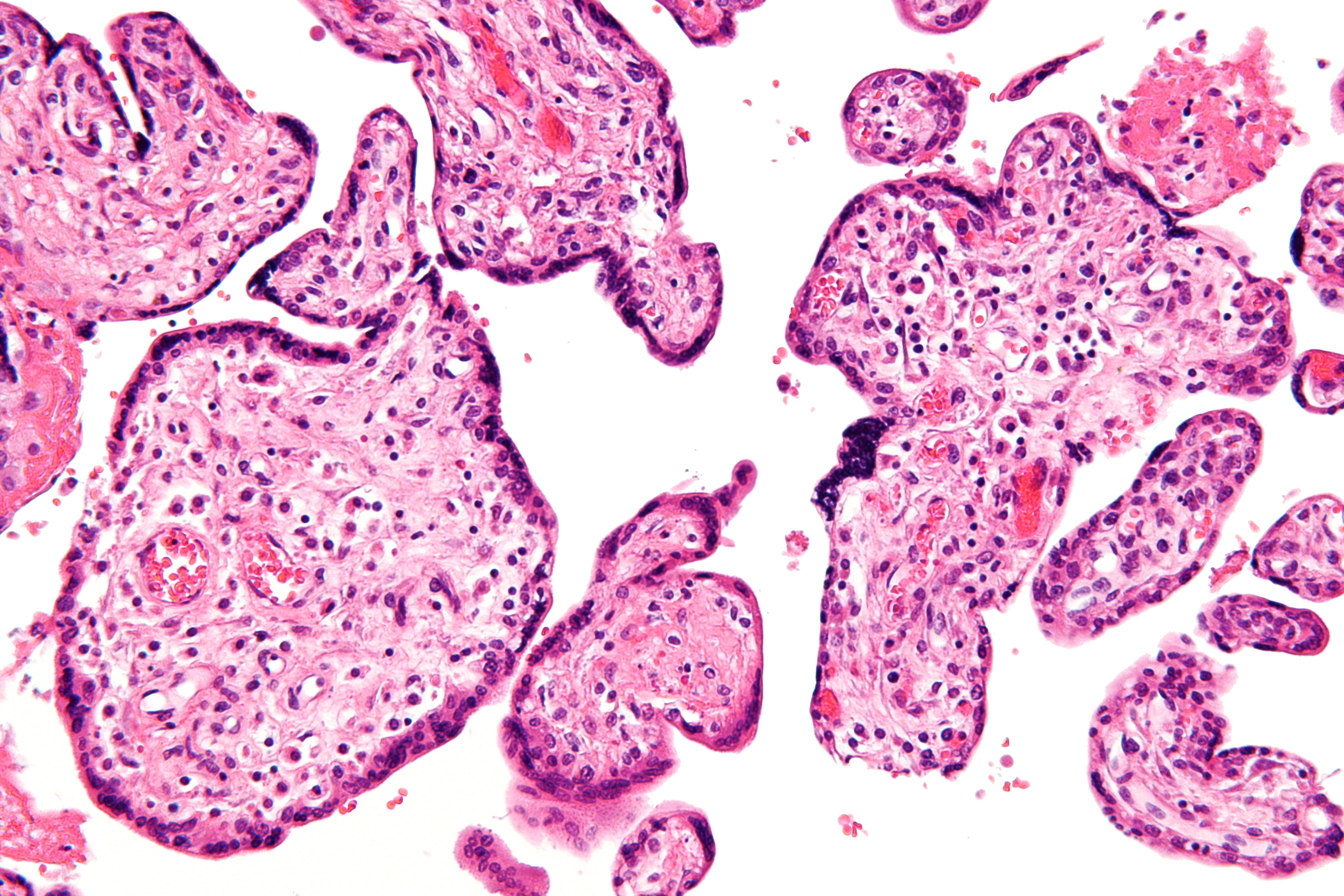
High mag.

=== Differential diagnosis ===
VUE is often confused with infectious villitis. They can be differentiated by the following characteristics: There are no signs of infection in either the mother or the infant with VUE. Infectious villi there is both maternal and foetal infection. VUE is more common than infectious villitis; Infectious villitis is present in approximately 1–4 births per 1000 births. VUE is present in approximately 76–136 births per 1000 births. VUE occurs in the term placenta, in the late third trimester of pregnancy. Infectious villitis occurs at the early-third to late-second trimester of the pregnancy. Infectious villitis involves a greater part of the placenta (umbilical cord, chorionic plate, membranes) compared to VUE (terminal and stem villi). Histologically VUE is characterised with more lymphocytes present than infectious villitis. Recurrence of infectious villitis is rare. VUE has a 10% to 15% recurrence rate.

== Prevention ==
There are no known prevention methods for VUE, but it is predicted that it could be due to infection by Treponema pallidum, Toxoplasma gondii, and cytomegalovirus.

== Epidemiology ==
In New Zealand VUE is more common in Caucasians than in Maori and Asian ancestry. Obese women are more likely to develop VUE; this could be due to obese women having larger placentas, thus having a greater number of villous macrophages which could increase the efficiency of antigen presentation resulting in VUE.

== See also ==
- Intrauterine growth restriction
- Placenta
- TORCH infections
