= Fetal thrombotic vasculopathy =

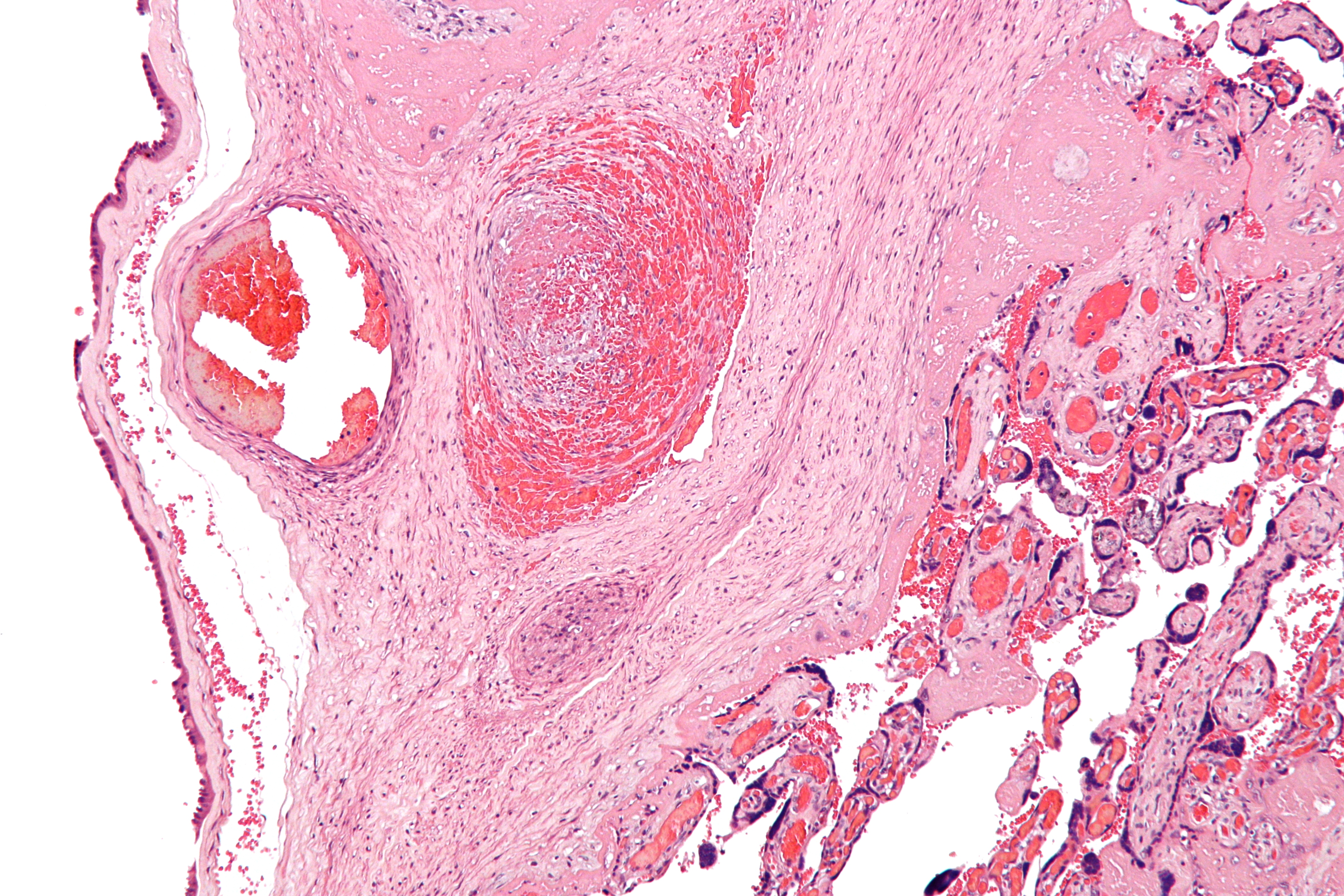
- Intermediate magnification micrograph of the placental disc showing a thrombosed fetal vein, as may be seen in fetal thrombotic vasculopathy. H&E stain.
- Specialty: Pathology

Fetal thrombotic vasculopathy is a chronic disorder characterized by thrombosis in the fetus leading to vascular obliteration and hypoperfusion.

It is associated with cerebral palsy and stillbirth.

It is more common in women who have diabetes mellitus.

== Diagnosis ==
It can be diagnosed by histomorphologic examination of the placenta and is characterized by fetal vessel thrombosis and clustered fibrotic chorionic villi without blood vessels.

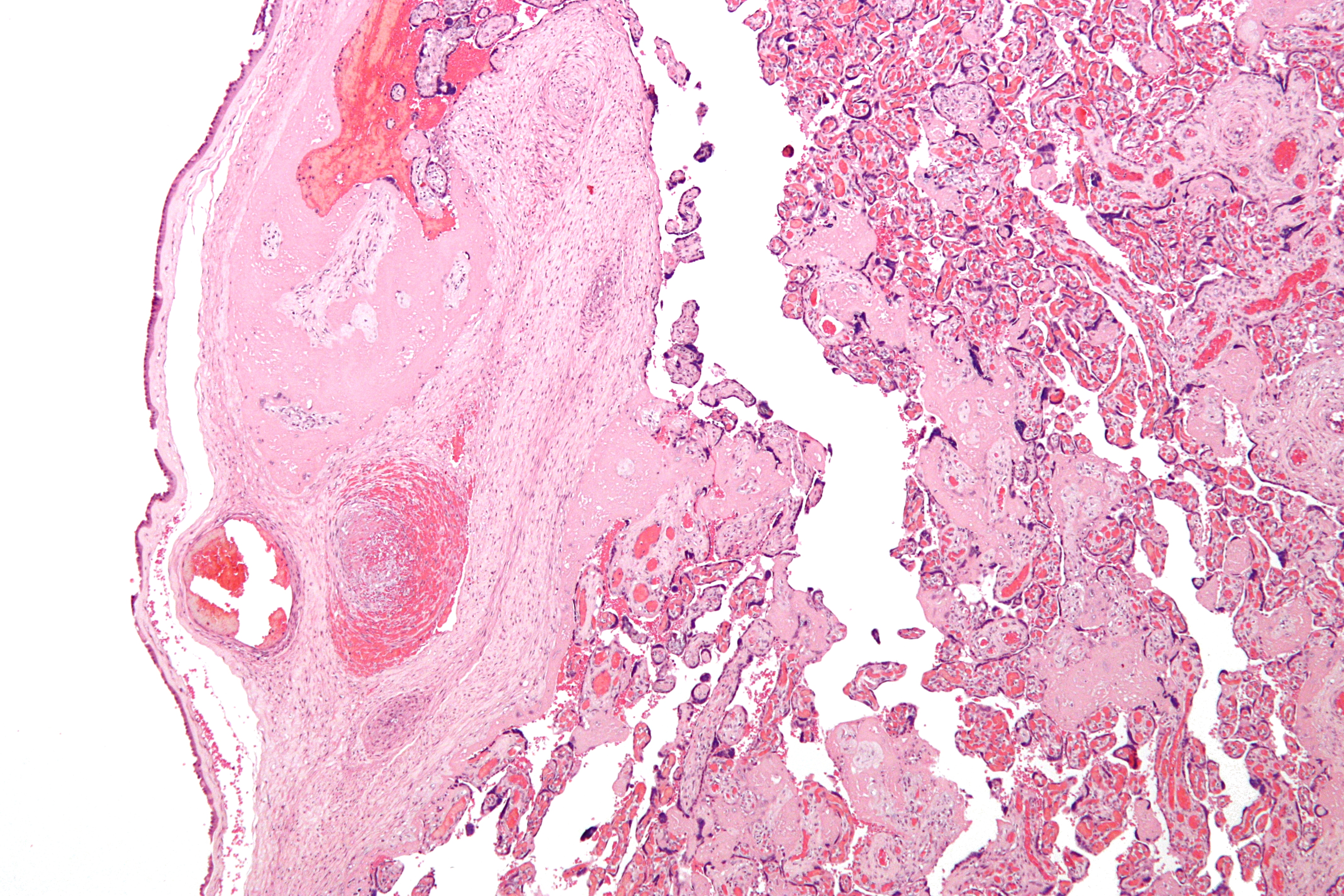
Low mag.

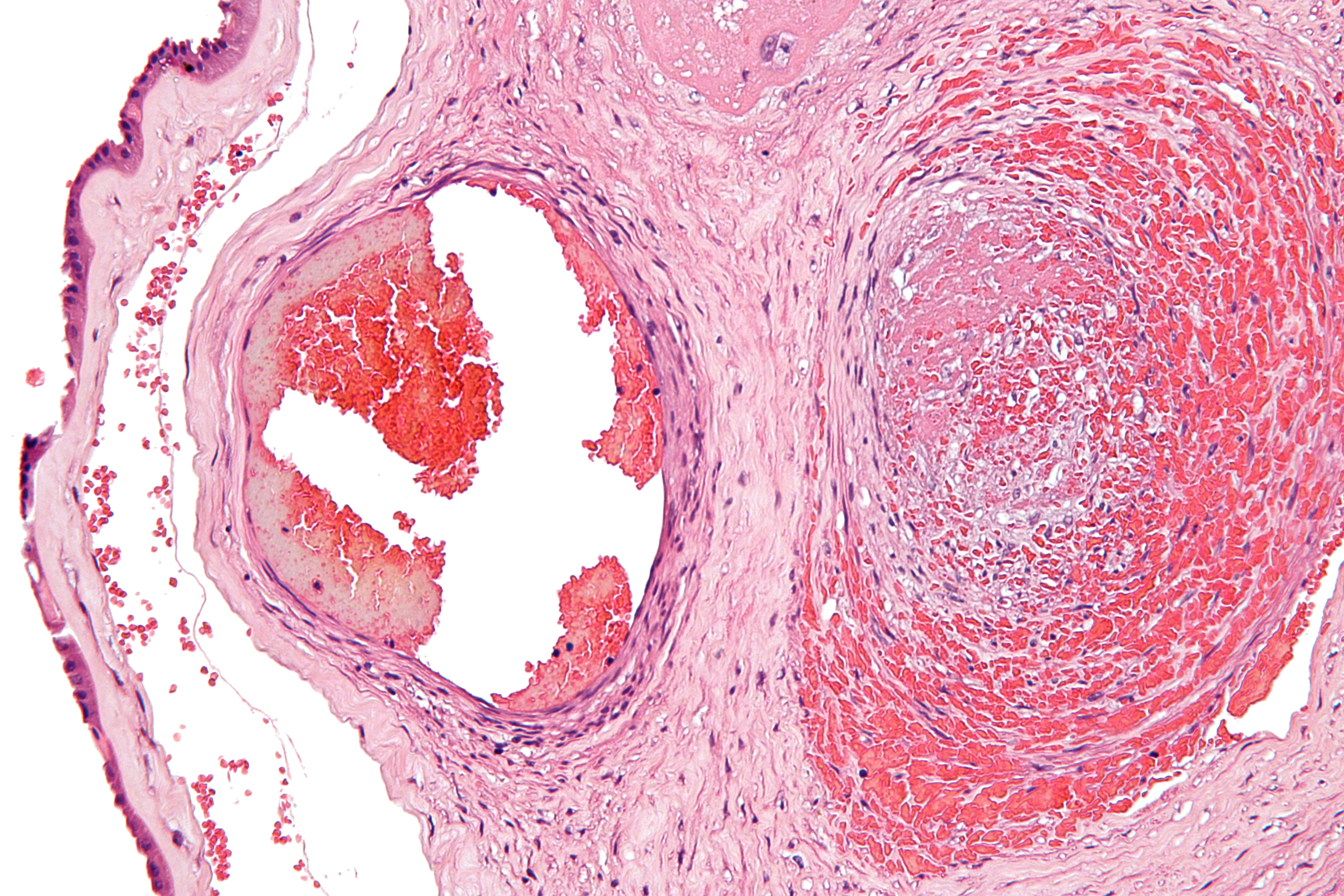
High mag.

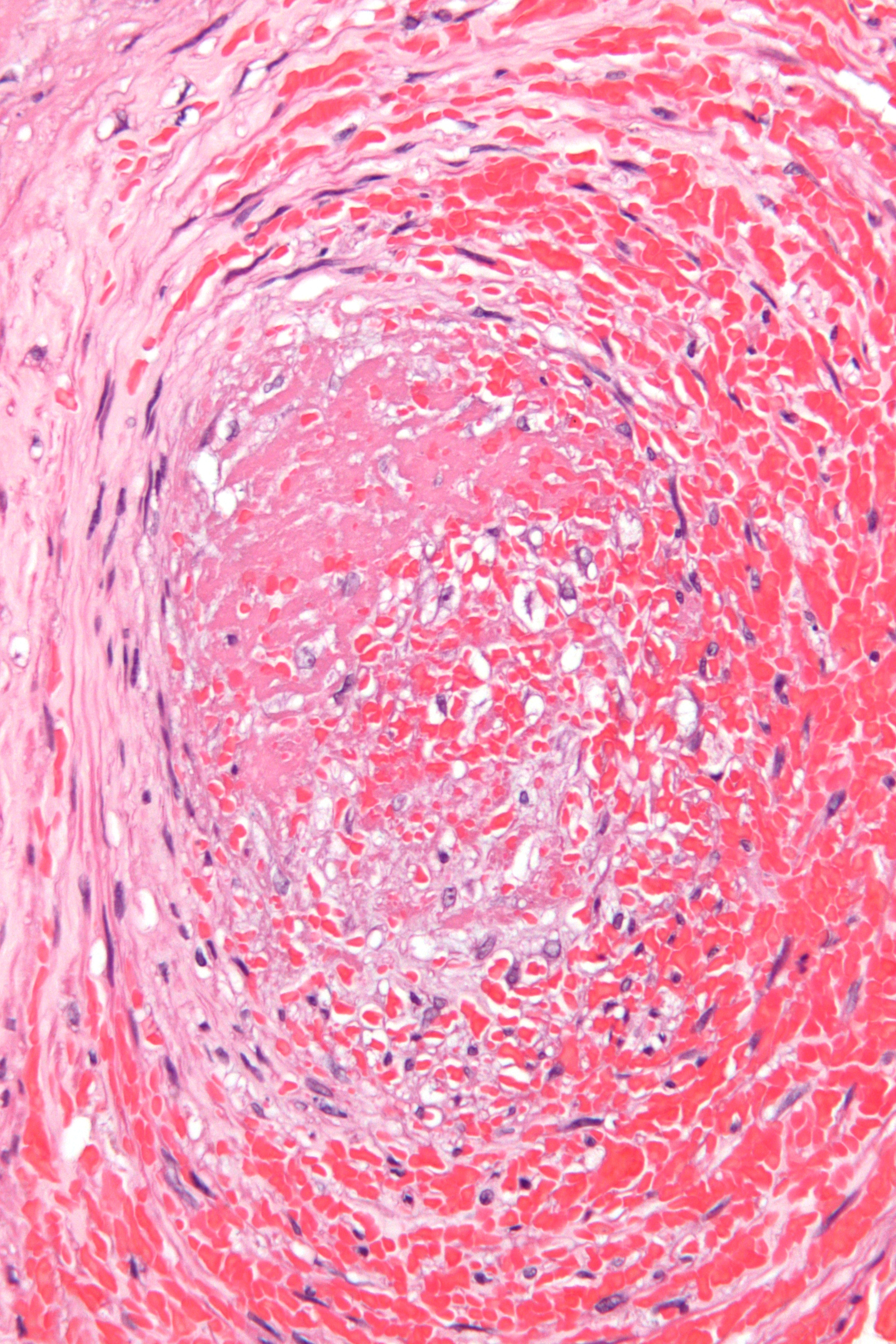
Very high mag.

== See also ==
- Hypertrophic decidual vasculopathy
