= Placental infarction =

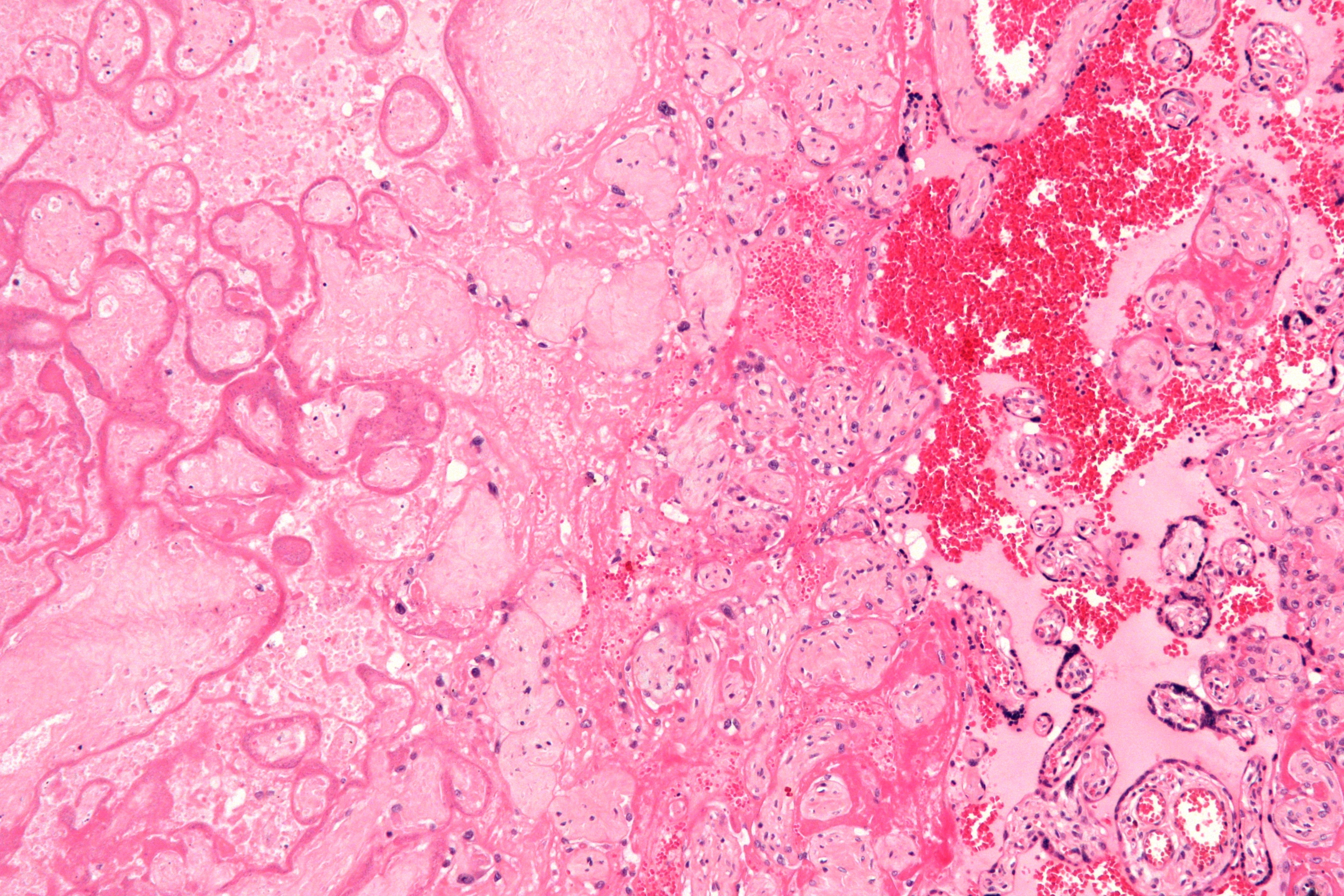
- Micrograph of a placental infarct. H&E stain.
- Specialty: Obstetrics

A placental infarction results from the interruption of blood supply to a part of the placenta, causing its cells to die.

Small placental infarcts, especially at the edge of the placental disc, are considered to be normal at term. Large placental infarcts are associated with vascular abnormalities, e.g. hypertrophic decidual vasculopathy, as seen in hypertension. Very large infarcts lead to placental insufficiency and may result in fetal death. Placental infarcts are generally detected after birth, although using ultrasound may be a way to notice infarcts prenatally. This method still needs more research and may not be completely effective in noticing infarcts.

== Relation to maternal floor infarct ==
Maternal floor infarcts are not considered to be true placental infarcts, as they result from deposition of fibrin around the chorionic villi, i.e. perivillous fibrin deposition.

== See also ==
- Placental disease
