= Chorangiosis =

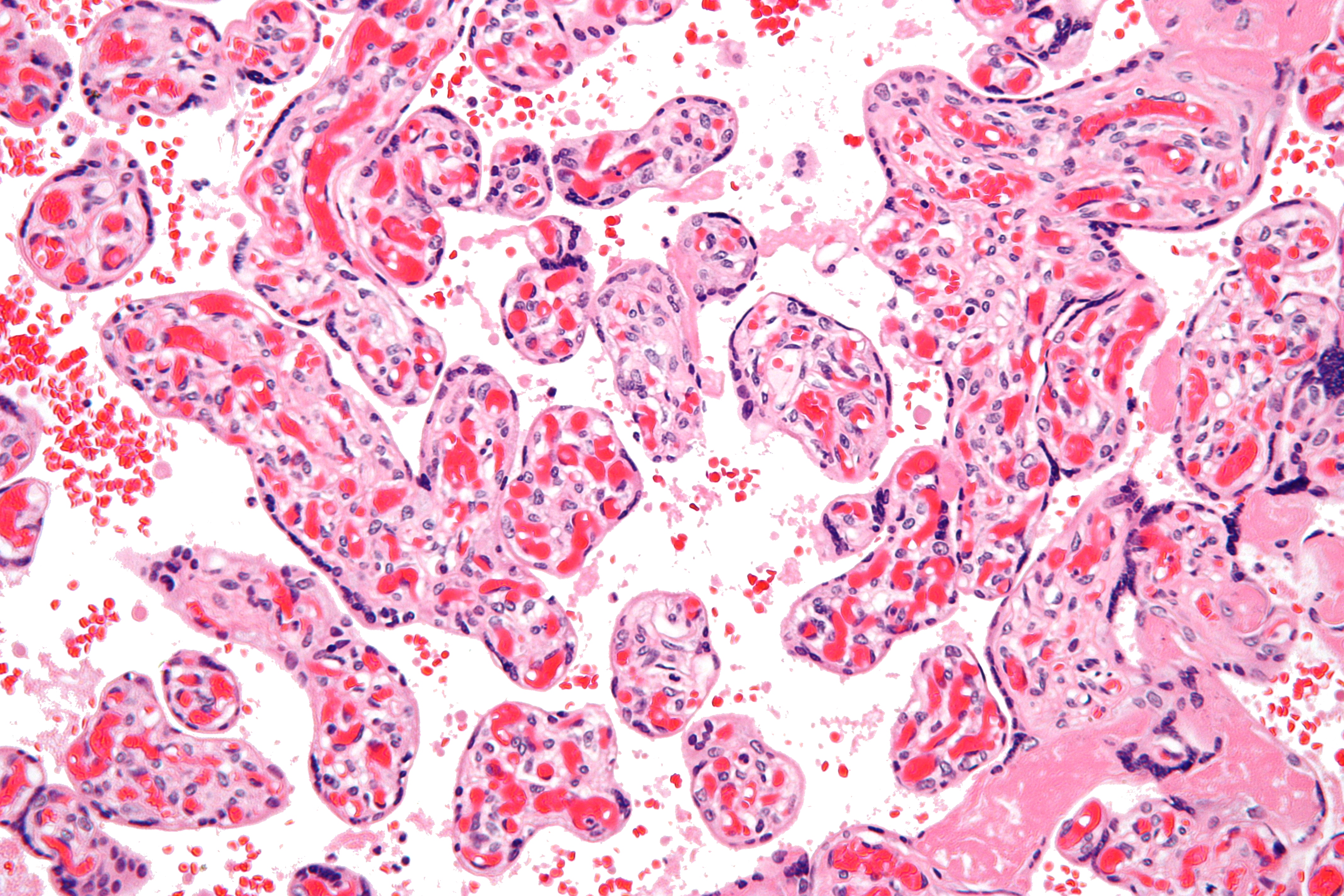
- Micrograph of a chorangiosis. H&E stain.
- Specialty: Pathology

Chorangiosis is a placental pathology characterized by an abundance of blood vessels within the chorionic villi.

== Associations ==
It is associated with gestational diabetes, smoking and high altitude.

== Diagnosis ==
It is diagnosed by a microscopic examination of the placenta.

Commonly used criteria from Altshuler are: "a minimum of 10 villi, each with 10 or more vascular channels, in 10 or more areas of 3 or more random, non-infarcted placental areas when using a ×10 ocular." The Altshuler criteria are not theoretically rigorous, as they do not define the area. Normal villi have up to five vascular channels.

== See also ==
- Chorangioma

== Additional images ==
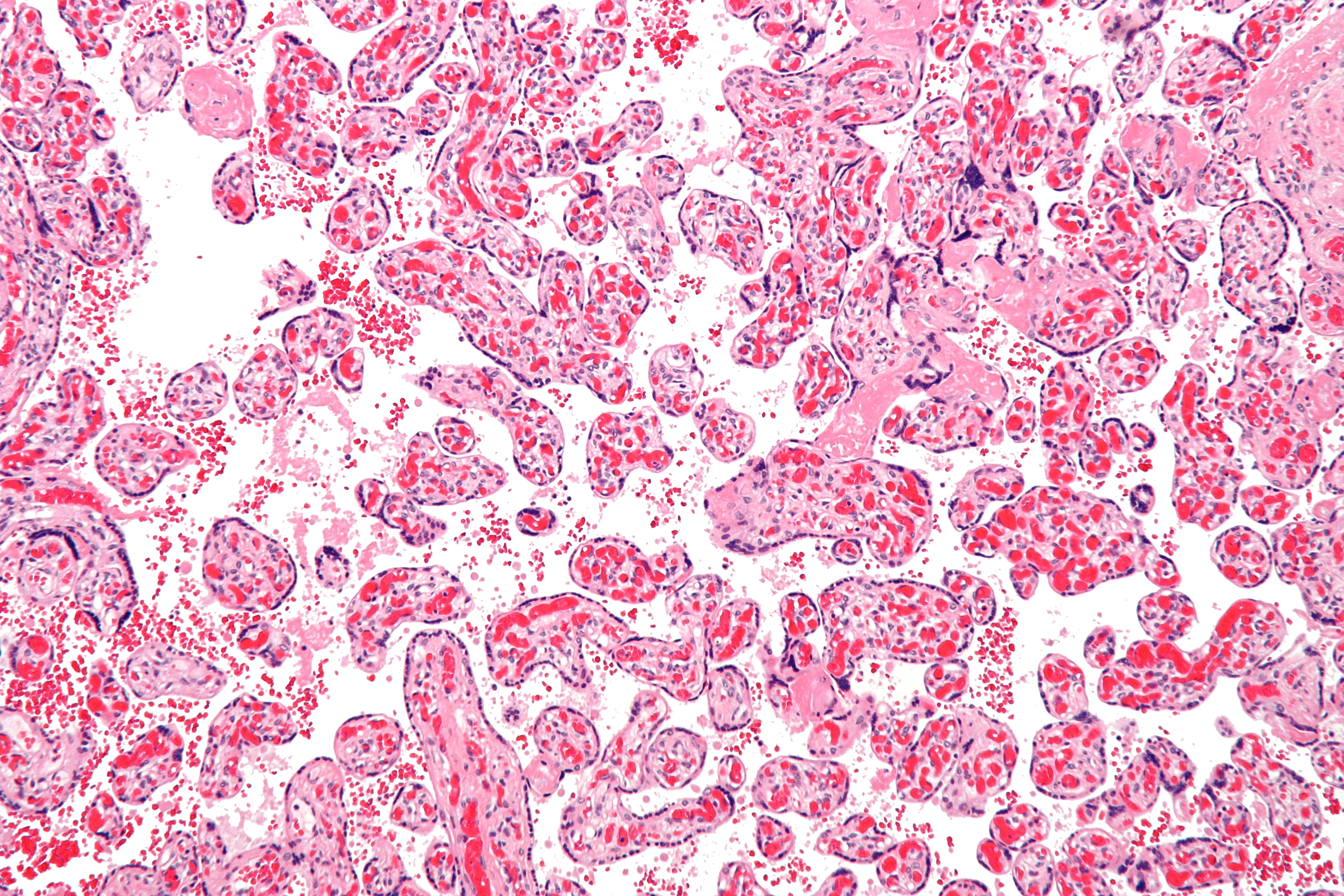
Intermed. mag.

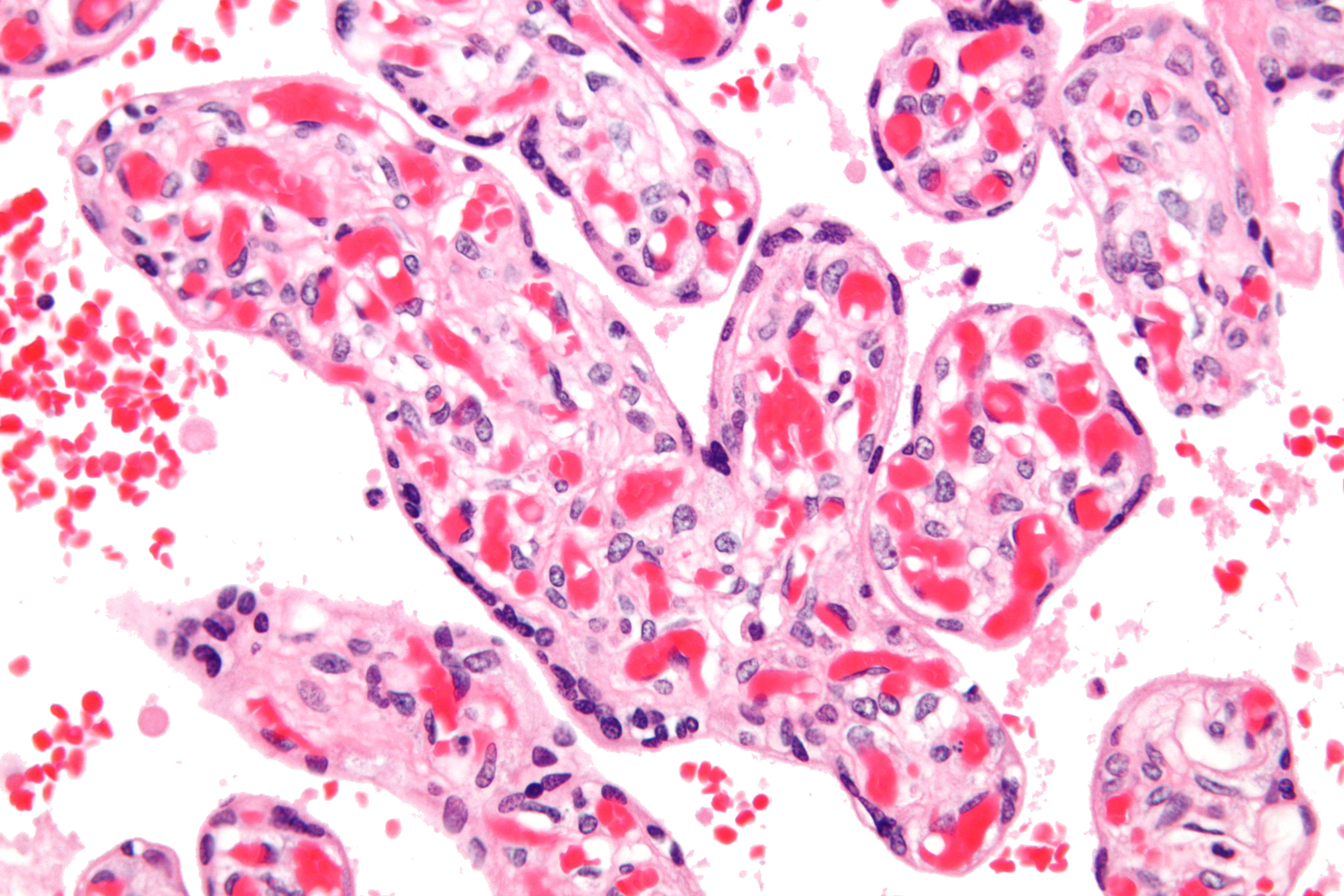
Very high mag.
