= Hypertrophic decidual vasculopathy =

Medical condition of the uterus

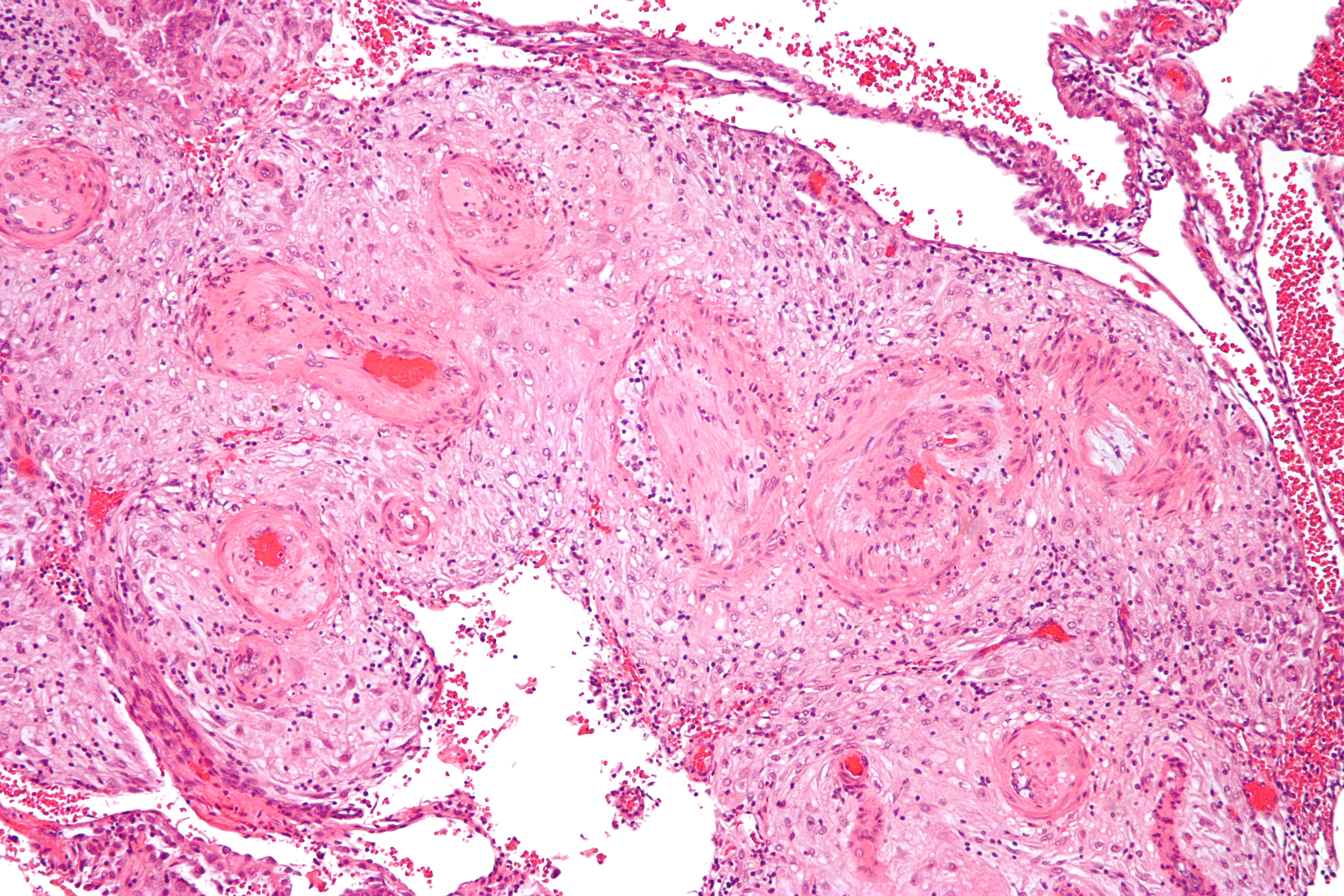
Micrograph showing hypertrophic decidual vasculopathy, the histomorphologic correlate of gestational hypertension. H&E stain.

In pathology, hypertrophic decidual vasculopathy, abbreviated HDV, is the histomorphologic correlate of gestational hypertension, as may be seen in intrauterine growth restriction (IUGR) and HELLP syndrome.

The name of the condition describes its appearance under the microscope; the smooth muscle of the decidual (or maternal) blood vessels is hypertrophic, i.e. the muscle part of the blood vessels feeding the placenta is larger due to cellular enlargement.

== Morphologic features ==
The morphologic features of mild and moderate HDV include:

- Perivascular inflammatory cells,
- +/-Vascular thrombosis,
- Smooth muscle hypertrophy, and
- Endothelial hyperplasia.

Severe HDV is characterized by:

- Atherosis - foamy macrophages within vascular wall, and
- Fibrinoid necrosis of vessel wall (amorphous eosinophilic vessel wall).

== See also ==
- Fetal thrombotic vasculopathy
- Gestational diabetes
- Placenta
- Pregnancy
