= Intrauterine growth restriction =

- Other names: Fetal growth restriction (FGR), intrauterine growth retardation,
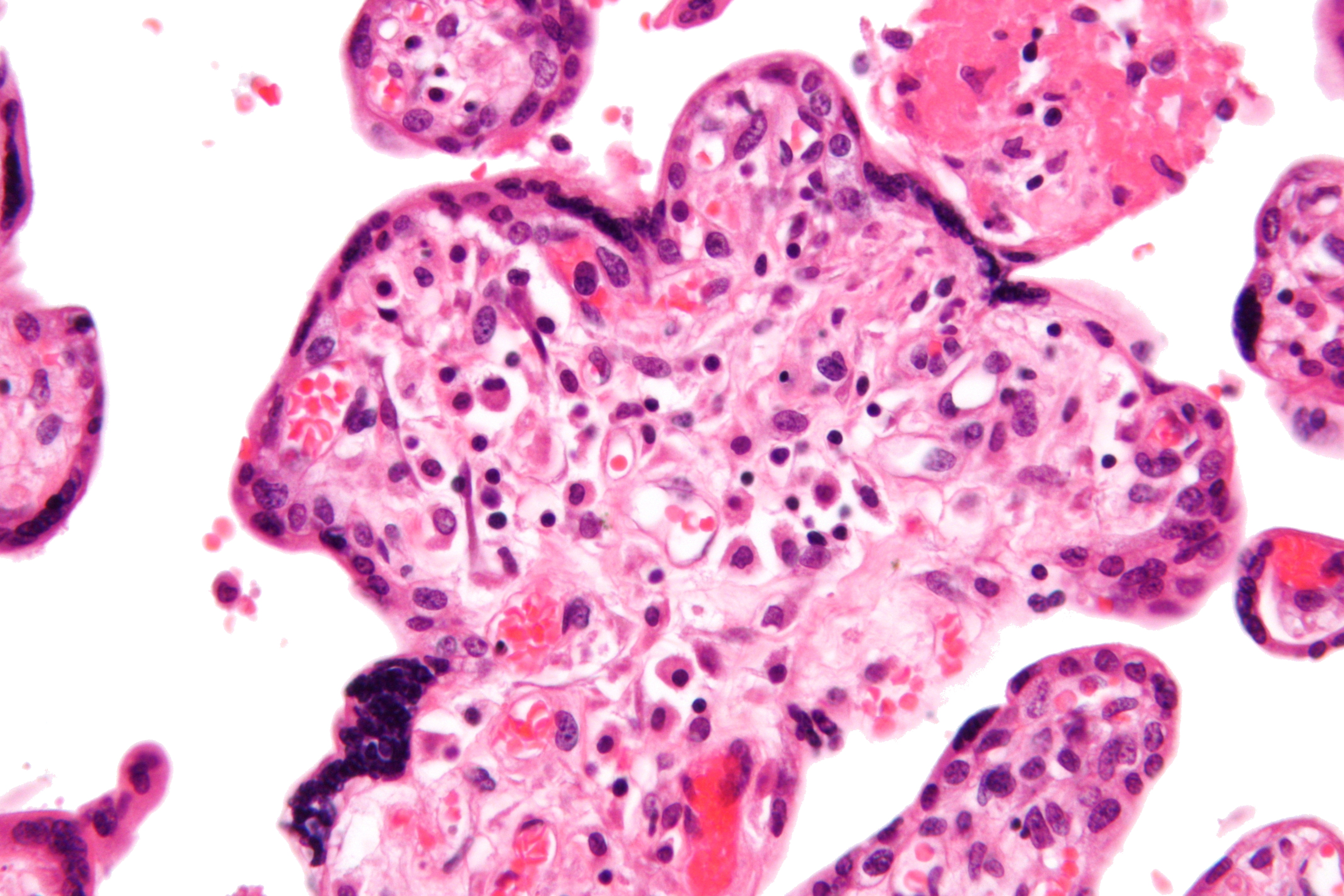
- Micrograph of villitis of unknown etiology, a placental pathology associated with IUGR. H&E stain.
- Specialty: Pediatrics, obstetrics

Intrauterine growth restriction (IUGR), or fetal growth restriction, is the poor growth of a fetus while in the womb during pregnancy. IUGR is defined by clinical features of malnutrition and evidence of reduced growth regardless of an infant's birth weight percentile. The causes of IUGR are broad and may involve maternal, fetal, or placental complications.

At least 60% of the 4 million neonatal deaths that occur worldwide every year are associated with low birth weight, caused by intrauterine growth restriction (IUGR), preterm delivery, and genetic abnormalities, demonstrating that under-nutrition is already a leading health problem at birth.

Intrauterine growth restriction can result in a baby being small for gestational age (SGA), which is most commonly defined as a weight below the 10th percentile for the gestational age. At the end of pregnancy, it can result in a low birth weight.

== Types ==
There are two major categories of IUGR: pseudo IUGR and true IUGR

With pseudo IUGR, the fetus has a birth weight below the tenth percentile for the corresponding gestational age but has a normal ponderal index, subcutaneous fat deposition, and body proportion. Pseudo IUGR occurs due to uneventful intrauterine course and can be rectified by proper postnatal care and nutrition. Such babies are also called small for gestational age.

True IUGR occurs due to pathological conditions which may be either fetal or maternal in origin. In addition to low body weight they have abnormal ponderal index, body disproportion, and low subcutaneous fat deposition. There are two types – symmetrical and asymmetrical. Some conditions are associated with both symmetrical and asymmetrical growth restriction.

=== Asymmetrical ===
Asymmetrical IUGR accounts for 70-80% of all IUGR cases. In asymmetrical IUGR, there is decreased oxygen or nutrient supply to the fetus during the third trimester of pregnancy due to placental insufficiency. This type of IUGR is sometimes called "head sparing" because brain growth is typically less affected, resulting in a relatively normal head circumference in these children. Because of decreased oxygen supply to the fetus, blood is diverted to the vital organs, such as the brain and heart. As a result, blood flow to other organs – including liver, muscle, and fat – is decreased. This causes abdominal circumference in these children to be decreased.

A lack of subcutaneous fat leads to a thin and small body out of proportion with the liver. Normally at birth the brain of the fetus is 3 times the weight of its liver. In IUGR, it becomes 5-6 times. In these cases, the embryo/fetus has grown normally for the first two trimesters but encounters difficulties in the third, sometimes secondary to complications such as pre-eclampsia. Other symptoms than the disproportion include dry, peeling skin and an overly-thin umbilical cord. The baby is at increased risk of hypoxia and hypoglycemia. This type of IUGR is most commonly caused by extrinsic factors that affect the fetus at later gestational ages. Specific causes include:

- Chronic high blood pressure
- Severe malnutrition
- Genetic mutations, Ehlers–Danlos syndrome

=== Symmetrical ===
Symmetrical IUGR is commonly known as global growth restriction, and indicates that the fetus has developed slowly throughout the duration of the pregnancy and was thus affected from a very early stage. The head circumference of such a newborn is in proportion to the rest of the body. Since most neurons are developed by the 18th week of gestation, the fetus with symmetrical IUGR is more likely to have permanent neurological sequelae. Common causes include:

- Early intrauterine infections, such as cytomegalovirus, rubella or toxoplasmosis
- Chromosomal abnormalities
- Anemia
- Maternal substance use (prenatal alcohol use can result in Fetal alcohol syndrome)

== Causes ==
IUGR is caused by a variety of factors; these can be fetal, maternal, placental or genetic factors.

=== Maternal ===
- Pre-pregnancy weight and nutritional status
- Poor weight gain during pregnancy
- Malnutrition
- Anemia
- Substance use: smoking, alcohol, drugs including marijuana or cocaine
- Medication: warfarin, steroids, anticonvulsants
- Inter-pregnancy interval of less than 6 months
- Assisted reproductive technologies
- Pre-gestational diabetes
- Gestational diabetes
- Pulmonary disease
- Cardiovascular disease
- Kidney disease
- Hypertension
- Celiac disease increases the risk of intrauterine growth restriction by an odds ratio of approximately 2.48
- Subclinical hypothyroidism
- Blood clotting disorder/disease (e.g., Factor V Leiden)

=== Uteroplacental ===
- Preeclampsia
- Multiple gestation
- Uterine malformations
- Placental insufficiency

=== Fetal ===
- Chromosomal abnormalities
- Vertically transmitted infections: TORCH, Malaria, congenital HIV infection, Syphilis
- Erythroblastosis fetalis
- Congenital abnormalities

=== Genetic ===
- Placental genes
- Maternal genes: Endothelin-1 over-expression, Leptin under-expression
- Fetal genes

== Pathophysiology ==
If the cause of IUGR is extrinsic to the fetus (parental or uteroplacental), transfer of oxygen and nutrients to the fetus is decreased. This causes a reduction in the fetus' stores of glycogen and lipids. This often leads to hypoglycemia at birth. Polycythemia can occur secondary to increased erythropoietin production caused by the chronic hypoxemia. Hypothermia, thrombocytopenia, leukopenia, hypocalcemia, and bleeding in the lungs are often results of IUGR.

Infants with IUGR are at increased risk of perinatal asphyxia due to chronic hypoxia, usually associated with placental insufficiency, placental abruption, or an umbilical cord accident. This chronic hypoxia also places IUGR infants at elevated risk of persistent pulmonary hypertension of the newborn, which can impair an infant's blood oxygenation and transition to postnatal circulation.

If the cause of IUGR is intrinsic to the fetus, growth is restricted due to genetic factors or as a sequela of infection. IUGR is associated with a wide range of short- and long-term neurodevelopmental disorders.

=== Cardiovascular ===
In IUGR, there is an increase in vascular resistance in the placental circulation, causing an increase in cardiac afterload. There is also increased vasoconstriction of the arteries in the periphery, which occurs in response to chronic hypoxia in order to preserve adequate blood flow to the fetus' vital organs. This prolonged vasoconstriction leads to remodeling and stiffening of the arteries, which also contributes to the increase in cardiac afterload. Therefore, the fetal heart must work harder to contract during each heartbeat, which leads to an increase in wall stress and cardiac hypertrophy. These changes in the fetal heart lead to increased long-term risk of hypertension, atherosclerosis, cardiovascular disease, and stroke.

=== Pulmonary ===
Normal lung development is interrupted in fetuses with IUGR, which increases their risk for respiratory compromise and impaired lung function later in life. Preterm infants with IUGR are more likely to have bronchopulmonary dysplasia (BPD), a chronic lung disease that is thought to be associated with prolonged use of mechanical ventilation.

=== Neurological ===
IUGR is associated with long-term motor deficits and cognitive impairment. In order to adapt to the chronic hypoxia associated with placental insufficiency, blood flow is redirected to the brain to try to preserve brain growth and development as much as possible. Even though this is thought to be protective, fetuses with IUGR who have undergone this brain-sparing adaptation have worse neurological outcomes compared with those who have not undergone this adaptation.

Magnetic resonance imaging (MRI) can detect changes in volume and structural development of infants with IUGR compared with those whose growth is appropriate for gestational age (AGA). But MRI is not easily accessible for all patients.

White matter effects – In postpartum studies of infants, it was shown that there was a decrease of the fractal dimension of the white matter in IUGR infants at one year corrected age. This was compared to at term and preterm infants at one year adjusted corrected age.

Grey matter effects – Grey matter was also shown to be decreased in infants with IUGR at one year corrected age.

Children with IUGR are often found to exhibit brain reorganization including neural circuitry. Reorganization has been linked to learning and memory differences between children born at term and those born with IUGR.

Studies have shown that children born with IUGR had lower IQ. They also exhibit other deficits that point to frontal lobe dysfunction.

IUGR infants with brain-sparing show accelerated maturation of the hippocampus which is responsible for memory. This accelerated maturation can often lead to uncharacteristic development that may compromise other networks and lead to memory and learning deficiencies.

== Management ==
Mothers whose fetus is diagnosed with intrauterine growth restriction can be managed with several monitoring and delivery methods. It is currently recommended that any fetus that has growth restriction and additional structural abnormalities should be evaluated with genetic testing. In addition to evaluating the fetal growth velocity, the fetus should primarily be monitored by ultrasonography every 3–4 weeks. An additional monitoring technique is an Doppler velocimetry. Doppler velocimetry is useful in monitoring blood flow through the uterine and umbilical arteries, and may indicate signs of uteroplacental insufficiency. This method may also detect blood vessels, specifically the ductus venosus and middle cerebral arteries, which are not developing properly or may not adapt well after birth. Monitoring via Doppler velocimetry has been shown to decrease the risk of morbidity and mortality before and after parturition among IUGR patients. Standard fetal surveillance via nonstress tests and/or biophysical profile scoring is also recommended. Bed rest has not been found to improve outcomes and is not typically recommended. There is currently a lack of evidence supporting any dietary or supplemental changes that may prevent the development of IUGR.

The optimal timing of delivery for a fetus with IUGR is unknown. However, the timing of delivery is currently based on the cause of IUGR and parameters collected from the umbilical artery doppler. Some of these include: pulsatility index, resistance index, and end-diastolic velocities, which are measurements of the fetal circulation. Fetuses with an anticipated delivery before 34 weeks gestation are recommended to receive corticosteroids to facilitate fetal maturation. Anticipated births before 32 weeks should receive magnesium sulfate to protect development of the fetal brain.

== Outcomes ==
=== Postnatal complications ===
After correcting for several factors such as low gestational parental weight, it is estimated that only around 3% of pregnancies are affected by true IUGR. 20% of stillborn infants exhibit IUGR. Perinatal mortality rates are 4-8 times higher for infants with IUGR, and morbidity is present in 50% of surviving infants. Common causes of mortality in fetuses/infants with IUGR include: severe placental insufficiency and chronic hypoxia, congenital malformations, congenital infections, placental abruption, cord accidents, cord prolapse, placental infarcts, and severe perinatal depression.

IUGR is more common in preterm infants than in full term (37–40 weeks gestation) infants, and its frequency decreases with increasing gestational age. Relative to premature infants who do not exhibit IUGR, premature infants with IUGR are more likely to have adverse neonatal outcomes, including respiratory distress syndrome, intraventricular hemorrhage, and necrotizing enterocolitis. This association with prematurity suggests utility of screening for IUGR as a potential risk factor for preterm labor.

Feeding intolerance, hypothermia, hypoglycemia, and hyperglycemia are all common in infants in the postnatal period, indicating the need to closely manage these patients' temperature and nutrition. Furthermore, rapid metabolic and physiologic changes in the first few days after birth can yield susceptibility to hypocalcemia, polycythemia, immunologic compromise, and renal dysfunction.

=== Long-term consequences ===
According to the theory of thrifty phenotype, intrauterine growth restriction triggers epigenetic responses in the fetus that are otherwise activated in times of chronic food shortage. If the offspring actually develops in an environment where food is readily accessible, it may be more prone to metabolic disorders, such as obesity and type II diabetes.

Infants with IUGR may continue to show signs of abnormal growth throughout childhood. Infants with asymmetric IUGR (head-sparing) typically have more robust catch-up postnatal growth, as compared with infants with symmetric IUGR, who may remain small throughout life. The majority of catch-up growth occurs in the first 6 months of life, but can continue throughout the first two years. Approximately 10% of infants who are small for gestational age due to IUGR will still have short stature in late childhood.

Infants with IUGR are also at elevated risk for neurodevelopmental abnormalities, including motor delay and cognitive impairments. Low IQ in adulthood may occur in up to one third of infants born small for gestational age due to IUGR. Infants who fail to display adequate catch-up growth in the first few years of life may exhibit worse outcomes.

Catch-up growth can alter fat distribution in children diagnosed with IUGR as infants and increase risk of metabolic syndrome. Infants with IUGR may be susceptible to long-term dysfunction of several endocrine processes, including growth hormone signaling, the hypothalamic-pituitary-adrenal axis, and puberty. Renal dysfunction, disrupted lung development, and impaired bone metabolism are also associated with IUGR.

== Animals ==
In sheep, intrauterine growth restriction can be caused by heat stress in early to mid pregnancy. The effect is attributed to reduced placental development causing reduced fetal growth. Hormonal effects appear implicated in the reduced placental development. Although early reduction of placental development is not accompanied by concurrent reduction of fetal growth; it tends to limit fetal growth later in gestation. Normally, ovine placental mass increases until about day 70 of gestation, but high demand on the placenta for fetal growth occurs later. (For example, research results suggest that a normal average singleton Suffolk x Targhee sheep fetus has a mass of about 0.15 kg at day 70, and growth rates of about 31 g/day at day 80, 129 g/day at day 120 and 199 g/day at day 140 of gestation, reaching a mass of about 6.21 kg at day 140, a few days before parturition.)

In adolescent ewes (i.e. ewe hoggets), overfeeding during pregnancy can also cause intrauterine growth restriction, by altering nutrient partitioning between dam and conceptus. Fetal growth restriction in adolescent ewes overnourished during early to mid pregnancy is not avoided by switching to lower nutrient intake after day 90 of gestation; whereas such switching at day 50 does result in greater placental growth and enhanced pregnancy outcome. Practical implications include the importance of estimating a threshold for "overnutrition" in management of pregnant ewe hoggets. In a study of Romney and Coopworth ewe hoggets bred to Perendale rams, feeding to approximate a conceptus-free live mass gain of 0.15 kg/day (i.e. in addition to conceptus mass), commencing 13 days after the midpoint of a synchronized breeding period, yielded no reduction in lamb birth mass, where compared with feeding treatments yielding conceptus-free live mass gains of about 0 and 0.075 kg/day. In both of the above models of IUGR in sheep, the absolute magnitude of uterine blood flow is reduced. Evidence of substantial reduction of placental glucose transport capacity has been observed in pregnant ewes that had been heat-stressed during placental development.

== See also ==
- Runt
- Interspecific pregnancy can cause this in animals
