= Antepartum bleeding =

- Other names: Antepartum haemorrhage (APH), prepartum haemorrhage
- Specialty: Obstetrics

Antepartum bleeding, also known as antepartum haemorrhage (APH) or prepartum hemorrhage, is genital bleeding during pregnancy after the 24th week of pregnancy up to delivery.

It can be associated with reduced fetal birth weight. Use of aspirin before 16 weeks of pregnancy to prevent pre-eclampsia also appears effective at preventing antepartum bleeding.

In regard to treatment, it should be considered a medical emergency (regardless of whether there is pain), as if it is left untreated it can lead to death of the mother or baby.

== Classification ==
The total amount of blood loss and signs of circulatory shock due to blood determine the severity of the antepartum haemorrhaging. There are 4 degrees of antepartum haemorrhaging:

Stage	Amount of Blood Loss
Spotting	Stains, streaking, or spotting of blood
Minor Haemorrhage	Less than 50mL
Major Haemorrhage	50-1000mL without signs of circulatory shock
Massive Haemorrhage	Greater than 1000mL with or without signs of circulatory shock

== Causes ==
=== Placenta praevia ===
Placenta praevia refers to when the placenta of a growing foetus is attached abnormally low within the uterus. Intermittent antepartum haemorrhaging occurs in 72% of women living with placenta praevia. The severity of a patient's placenta praevia depends on the location of placental attachment;

Type	Location of Placental Attachment
Type 1	Lower segment of uterus, no attachment to the cervix
Type 2	Touching but not covering the internal orifice of the cervix
Type 3	Partially covering the internal orifice of the cervix
Type 4	Completely covering the internal orifice of the cervix

Types 1 and 2 are classified as minor placental praevia as these typically result in minor antepartum haemorrhaging. Types 3 and 4 are referred to as major placental praevia due to the risk of heavy haemorrhaging in the case of a rupture due to the location of placental attachment. During the third trimester of pregnancy, thinning of the lower uterine segment or contractions caused by cervical dilation can increase the amount of stress placed on the placental attachment to the uterine wall. In patients with placenta praevia, these stresses can cause detachment of the placenta from the uterine wall causing haemorrhaging. To prevent further haemorrhaging patients with major placental praevia are recommended to have a caesarean delivery.

=== Abnormal placentation ===
During pregnancy the layer of endometrium that attaches directly to developing blastocyst becomes the maternal portion of the placenta, also known as the decidua basalis. In the absence of a decidua basalis, trophoblast cells on the developing blastocyst form an abnormally deep attachment to the uterine wall, this is known as abnormal placentation. Abnormal placentation can categorised into 3 types, depending on the depth of infiltration of the chorionic villi into the uterine wall:

Type	Depth of Chorionic Villus
Placenta Accreta	Attached to outermost portion of the myometrium
Placenta Increta	Invading the myometrium
Placenta Percreta	Invading past the myometrium into the perimetrium

In placenta percreta, the chorionic villi have grow entirely through the myometrium and invade into the perimetrium. Placenta percreta results in the most intense haemorrhaging that can be expected caused by abnormal placentation. In the event of placental detachment from the uterine wall, the depth of chorionic villi attachment dictates the amount of haemorrhaging that can be expected. The chance of abnormal placentation increases in subsequent pregnancies, if there is scar tissue present from previous pregnancies. For example, previously undergoing a caesarean or placenta previa increases the likelihood of abnormal placentation, therefore increasing the chances of antepartum haemorrhaging.

=== Placental abruption ===
Placental abruption occurs when the placenta detaches from the endometrium. Detachment causes antepartum haemorrhaging at the location of abruption. Depending on the site of detachment, haemorrhaging may or may not be apparent. If abruption occurs behind the placenta where blood cannot escape through the cervix, blood will pool and form a retroplacental clot. Only when the site of detachment occurs on the side facing the cervical opening can the total amount of haemorrhaging be measured by vaginal bleeding. Using vaginal bleeding as a measurement of the severity of the placental abruption is therefore ineffective. The scale of haemorrhaging depends on the degree to which the placenta has separated from the uterine wall. In the case of partial placental separation, haemorrhaging can be minor. However, in the case of total placental separation haemorrhaging will be major and emergency delivery will typically be the course of action. Placental abruption causes blood loss from the mother and loss of oxygen and nutrients to the placenta occasionally leading to preterm labour. Other causes of placental abruption can be abdominal trauma or sudden decompression of amniotic fluid, however it is not uncommon for the cause of placental abruption to be unknown.

=== Vasa praevia ===
Vasa praevia is the presence of unprotected foetal blood vessels running along the placenta and over the internal cervical opening. Vasa praevia is a very rare, presenting only 4:10,000 cases from the largest study of the condition. Risks of antepartum bleeding due to vasa praevia greatly increase during the third trimester of pregnancy during cervical dilation or placenta praevia. Vessel rupture is very likely in the event of a membranous rupture as foetal blood vessels aren't protected by the umbilical cord of the placenta. In the event of foetal vessel rupture, antepartum haemorrhaging occurs however blood is lost from the foetal blood supply. If the foetus is developed enough caesarean sections are often recommended.

=== Abnormal placental shape ===
- Circumvallate placenta

A circumvallate placenta refers to when the foetal membrane wraps twice around, over the foetal side around the edge of the placenta. This is to compensate for an undersized chorionic plate resulting in a decreased nutritional supply to the foetus. Thickening of the placental edge due to a circumvallate placenta can lead to placental abruption, causing antepartum haemorrhaging.

- Bilobed Placenta

A bilobed placenta has a cleavage in the middle dividing it into two lobes with membranous vessels branching in between. The exposed connecting membranous vessels present risk of rupturing due to limited protection from thrombosis and trauma. Bilobing of the placenta can be caused by placental implantation occurring over areas of uterine fibroid scarring, previous surgery, decreased blood supply or implantation occurring over the internal cervical orifice. Chances of vasa previa and placental abruption increase in the presence of a bilobed placenta due to decreased surface area for attachment to the uterine wall and the exposure of membranous vessels.

- Multilobed or Succenturiate Placenta

When a placenta has multiple lobes which are distal and not of equal size this is referred to as a succenturiate placenta. Distal lobes are connected by a placental artery and vein extending from the main placenta, which tends to be centrally located and is the largest in mass. At the time of contraction or delivery the connecting placental arteries and veins may rupture resulting in significant haemorrhaging. Incidences of vasa previa and haemorrhaging in the presence of a succenturiate placenta are highly increased.

- Fetal blood (can be distinguished with Apt test)

=== Minor causes ===
Cervical ectropion

There are 2 types of epithelial cells present within the cervical canal. In the endocervix the epithelia is columnar glandular which transitions into stratified squamous towards the ectocervix and external cervical orifice. During cervical ectropion the epithelial transitional zone (also called the squamo-columnar junction) migrates from the endocervical canal towards the ectocervix exposing some columnar glandular cells on the external cervical orifice. Unlike stratified squamous epithelial cells, glandular cells are columnar and not used to external stresses such as abrasion. The translocation of these cells causes bleeding and mucus secretion. Cervical ectropion can be attributed to rises in oestrogen levels during foetal development. Antepartum haemorrhage caused by cervical ectropion can be expected and is typically harmless.

Vaginal infection

The presence of severe vaginal infections at the time of pregnancy may cause minor antepartum haemorrhaging. For example, the presence of chlamydia, thrush, cervicitis or other infections are all irritants to the vaginal and cervical lining, causing bleeding from those surfaces where the infection is severe.

Cervical canal and distal genital tract

Most cases of Antepartum haemorrhaging originate from within the cervical canal or vagina. The amount of bleeding in these areas are typically limited to spotting or minor antepartum haemorrhaging. Cervical ectropion, dysplasia, polyps or cervical carcinoma may cause lesions in the cervix leading to minor haemorrhaging or spotting. Abrasion or slight trauma caused by intercourse, clinical examinations and pap smear may also cause spotting from the cervix. Vaginal bleeding from atrophy, vaginitis, and ulcers also attribute to minor haemorrhaging. Similarly, varicosities, tumours or inflammation in the vulva can cause minor antepartum haemorrhaging. Non genital tract bleeding caused by haematuria or haemorrhoids can often be mistaken for antepartum haemorrhaging and are typically harmless.

Endometriosis

Estimates of the frequency of endometriosis in women range between 6-15% across several sources. In a 30-year reproductive and pregnancy outcome study of 14,000+ women, those with endometriosis had a significantly increased risk of antepartum haemorrhage during pregnancy.

== Diagnosis ==
=== Differential diagnosis ===
- GI bleed - haemorrhoids, inflammatory bowel disease

== See also ==
- Obstetrical haemorrhage
