= Anomaly scan =

Ultrasound performed between 18–22 weeks of gestational age

- Synonyms: Anatomy scan, second-trimester ultrasound, 20-week ultrasound, level 2 ultrasound
- Purpose: To evaluate fetal anatomy and size

The anomaly scan, also sometimes called the anatomy scan, 20-week ultrasound, or level 2 ultrasound, evaluates anatomic structures of the fetus, placenta, and maternal pelvic organs. This scan is an important and common component of routine prenatal care. The function of the ultrasound is to measure the fetus so that growth abnormalities can be recognized quickly later in pregnancy, to assess for congenital malformations and multiple pregnancies, and to plan method of delivery.

== Procedure ==
This scan is conducted between 18 and 22 weeks' gestation, but most often performed at 19 weeks, as a component of routine prenatal care. Prior to 18 weeks' gestation, the fetal organs may be of insufficient size and development to allow for ultrasound evaluation. Scans performed beyond 22 weeks' gestation may limit the ability to seek pregnancy termination, depending on local legislation.

Two-dimensional (2D) is used to evaluate fetal structures, placenta, and amniotic fluid volume. Maternal pelvic organs are also evaluated. Views are obtained using an abdominal ultrasound probe, but a vaginal ultrasound probe may also be used to evaluate for placenta previa and cervical length. Three-dimensional (3D) ultrasound is not recommended for routine use during anomaly scan, but 3D ultrasound may be used to further evaluate suspected abnormalities in specific fetal features.

== Components ==
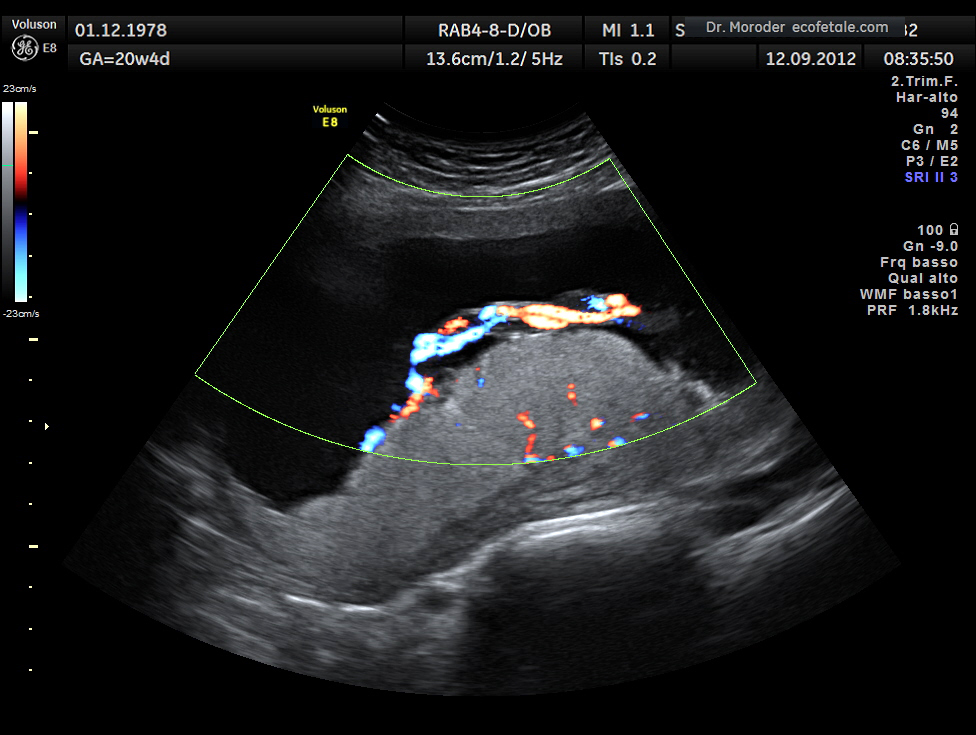
Anatomy scan image of a human placenta and umbilical cord (colour Doppler rendering) showing central placement of the cord in the placenta and three vessels in the cord, which is the normal physiology.

A standard anatomy scan typically includes:

- Fetal number, including number of amnionic sacs and chorionic sacs for multiple gestations
- Fetal cardiac activity
- Fetal position relative to the uterus and cervix
- Location and appearance of the placenta, including site of umbilical cord insertion
- Amniotic fluid volume
- Gestational age assessment
- Fetal weight estimation
- Fetal anatomical survey
- Evaluation of the maternal uterus, tubes, ovaries, and bladder when appropriate

== Medical uses ==
Anatomy scan of the fetal head at 20 weeks of pregnancy in a fetus affected by spina bifida. In the axial scan the characteristic lemon sign and banana sign are seen.

Anatomy scan with power bi-directional colour Doppler of both fetal kidneys at 18 weeks of pregnancy to detect renal agenesis. The videoclip shows a frontal scan with normal renal blood perfusion during fetal breathing movements.

Second-trimester ultrasound screening for aneuploidies, such as Edwards syndrome and Patau syndrome, is based on looking for soft markers and some predefined structural abnormalities. Soft markers are variations from normal anatomy, which are more common in aneuploid fetuses compared to euploid ones. These markers are often not clinically significant and do not cause adverse pregnancy outcomes, but used in order to decide whether additional tests, which will be more accurate, are needed. Placental evaluation is vital for planning method of delivery, as attempting natural childbirth can cause fatal amounts of blood loss in the mother if the placenta is covering the cervix (placenta praevia) and significantly increases the risk of stillbirth. Additionally, placental and umbilical cord abnormalities are also associated with certain fetal genetic abnormalities.

Conditions Identified During Anomaly Scan
Fetal Conditions	Placental Conditions	Maternal Conditions
Anencephaly; Cleft lip; Congenital heart defect; Diaphragmatic hernia; Gastrochisis; Congenital hydrocephalus; Omphalocele; Renal agenesis; Spina bifida; Osteochondrodysplasia; Edwards syndrome; Patau syndrome	Placenta previa; Vasa previa; Placenta accreta; 2 vessel cord; Succenturiate lobe; Circumvallate placenta; Velamentous cord insertion	Ovarian masses; Congenital uterine anomalies; Uterine septum; Bicornuate uterus; Uterine Leiomyoma; Short cervix

=== Sex determination ===
Fetal sex is often noted during the anomaly scan, but can also be detected during the quad scan. However, performing an ultrasound for the sole purpose of determining fetal sex without a medical indication is not recommended.

=== Limitations ===
Although ultrasound is a useful screening tool for fetal anomalies, the sensitivity of this scan is highly variable and potentially detects only 40% of all fetal anomalies. The ability of this scan to detect structural fetal abnormalities depends on a variety of factors. These factors include the severity of the anomaly, the background risk of the study population, gestational age at time of scan, the expertise of the ultrasound technician and interpreting obstetrician, and maternal obesity.

== See also ==
- Nuchal scan
