= Thomas Wharton (anatomist) =

English physician and anatomist (1614–1673)

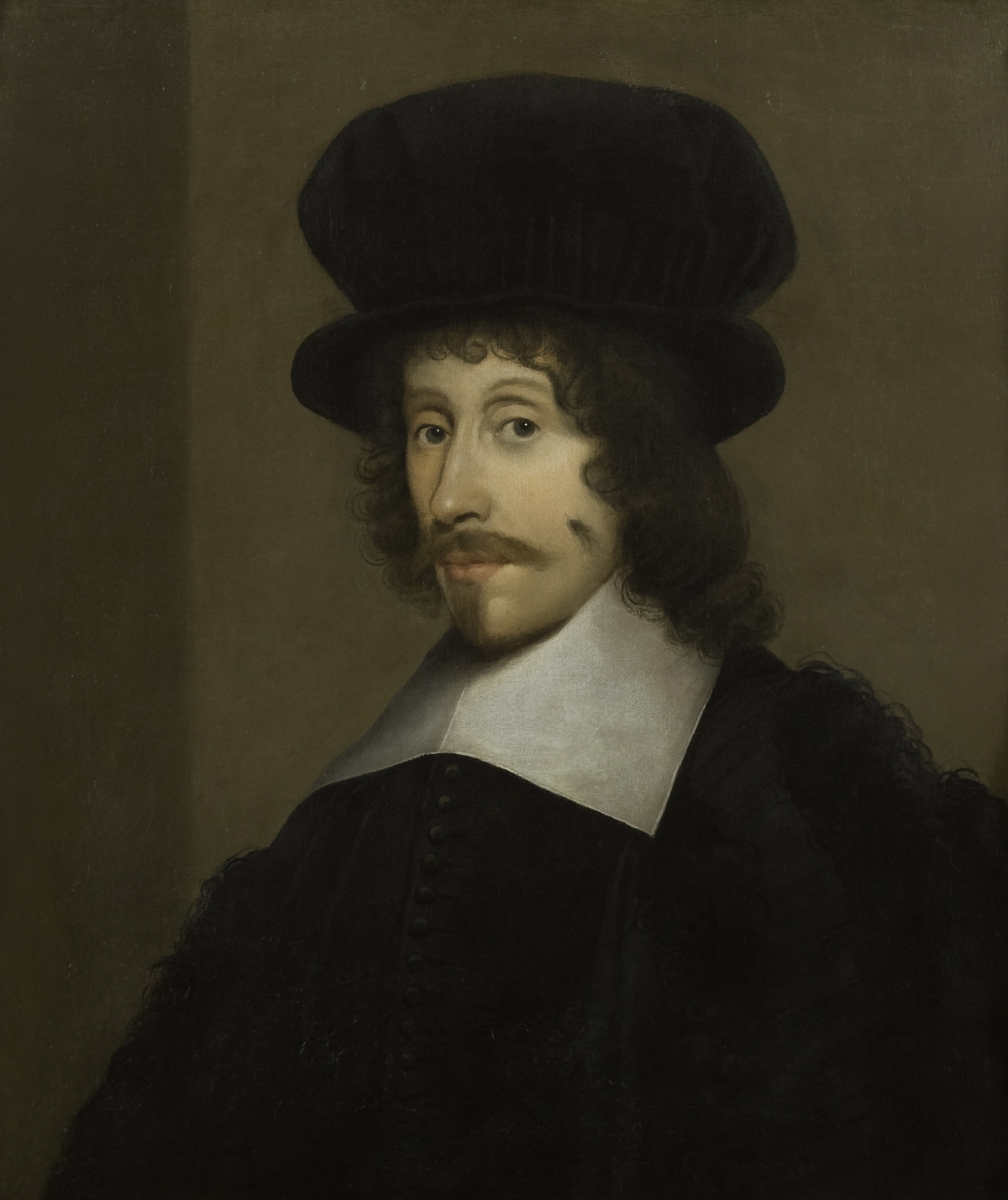
- Thomas Wharton ca 1650, painted by Anthony van Dyck
- Born: 31 August 1614; Winston, County Durham, County Durham
- Died: 15 November 1673 (aged 59); London
- Education: Pembroke College, Cambridge
- Known for: Submandibular duct, Wharton's jelly, Thyroid gland
- Scientific career
- Fields: Anatomy

Thomas Wharton (1614–1673) was an English physician and anatomist best known for his descriptions of the submandibular duct (one of the salivary ducts) and Wharton's jelly of the umbilical cord. He is known mostly from his one published work Adenographia, Glandularum, Totius Corporis Descriptio published in 1656.

== Life ==
Wharton was the only son of John Wharton (d. 10 June 1629) by his wife Elizabeth, daughter of Roger Hodson (d. 10 March 1646) of Fountains Abbey, and was born at Winston-on-Tees, county Durham, on 31 August 1614. His father died when he was 15 and he suffered from a severe febrile illness when he was 19. He was admitted as a sizar at Pembroke College, Cambridge, on 4 July 1638, and matriculated two days later. He migrated to Trinity College, Oxford in 1642, where he acted for some time as tutor to John Scrope, natural son of Emanuel Scrope, 1st Earl of Sunderland.

Later in 1642 he went to Bolton, where he remained three years studying; he also became and then, having decided upon his future profession, removed to London and studied medicine under John Bathurst In 1646 he returned to Oxford, and obtained his M.D. on 7 May 1647. He was entered as a candidate of the College of Physicians on 25 January 1648, chosen fellow on 23 December 1650, incorporated at Cambridge on his doctor's degree in 1652. He held the post of censor of the Royal College of Physicians in 1658, 1661, 1666, and 1673.

He obtained the appointment of physician to St Thomas's Hospital on 20 November 1659, and retained it till his death in 1673. Wharton was one of the very few physicians who remained at his post in London during the whole of the outbreak of the plague of 1665. His services were recognised by a promise of the first vacant appointment of physician in ordinary to the king. When, however, a vacancy occurred and he applied for the fulfilment of the promise, he was put off with a grant of honourable augmentation to his paternal arms, for which he had to pay Sir William Dugdale.

Wharton died at his house in Aldersgate Street on 15 November 1673, and was buried on the 20th in the church of St Michael Bassishaw in Basinghall Street. He married Jane, daughter of William Ashbridge of London, by whom he had three sons: Thomas, father of George Wharton (both physicians; George married Anna Maria, daughter of William Petty), Charles, and William; the last two died young. His wife predeceased him on 20 July 1669, and was buried at St Michael Bassishaw on the 23rd. A memorial in the church was moved in 1897.

== Work ==
Wharton described the glands more accurately than had previously been done, and made researches into their nature and use, relying on dissection and experiment. He was the discoverer of the duct of the sub-mandibulary gland for the conveyance of the saliva into the mouth, which bears his name. He made a special study of the minute anatomy of the pancreas. William Oughtred, in the epistle to his Clavis Mathematicae (London, 1648), speaks of Wharton's proficiency; and Izaak Walton, in his Compleat Angler, expresses indebtedness to Wharton, and calls him a friend.

He wrote four English verses under a fanciful engraving prefixed to a translation by Elias Ashmole, entitled Arcanum, or the Grand Secret of Hermetic Philosophy, and published in his Theatrum Chemicum Britannicum (London, 1652). Wharton and Bathurst had visited Arthur Dee for Ashmole (who translated his Fasciculus Chemicus, but never met him). Ashmole and Wharton worked together on the catalogue of the Musaeum Tradescantianum, printed in 1650, stemming from a visit they paid John Tradescant the younger in 1650. Their friendship was troubled, but reconciliation took place before Wharton's death.

Wharton published Adenographia; sive glandularum totius corporis descriptio, London, 1656 (plates); Amsterdam, 1659; Oberwesel, 1664, 1671,1675; Düsseldorf, 1730. Large portions of the work were printed in Le Clerc and Mangot's Bibliotheca Anatomica, Geneva, 1699. Hieronymus Barbatus in his Dissertatio Elegantissima de Sanguine, Paris, 1667, makes use of Wharton's work.
