= Cryo-Save =

The cord blood bank Cryo-Save AG shut their doors at the end of June 2019. By 17 September, they filed for liquidation. The brand name CryoSave and the client database now belong to CSG-BIO. The clients’ umbilical cords were moved in the 2nd quarter of 2019, to the Polish cord blood bank PBKM, the head of the FamiCord network. FamiCord does not own the cords, they are operating under a third party storage contract.

== History ==
By late August 2019, the FOPH had removed Cryo-Save AG from the list of authorized stem cell banks. Swissmedic revoked Cryo-Save's authorization to use umbilical cord tissues and initiated criminal proceedings for alleged violations of the law on therapeutic agents and transplants.

== Commercial activity ==
The Company started to store umbilical cord blood and cord tissue (Wharton's jelly) stem cells. Cryo-Save performs collection, analysis, processing and cryogenic preservation of three sources of human adult stem cells:

1. Hematopoietic stem cells obtained from the umbilical cord blood ("Cryocord")
2. Mesenchymal stem cells obtained from the umbilical cord tissue ("Cryocord+")
3. Mesenchymal stem cells obtained from adipose tissue

== Laboratories ==
Cryo-Save currently has processing and storage facilities in the UAE and South Africa.

=== Accreditations ===
The following accreditation:

- South Africa and the UAE: AABB
