= Placental abruption =

- Other names: Abruptio placentae
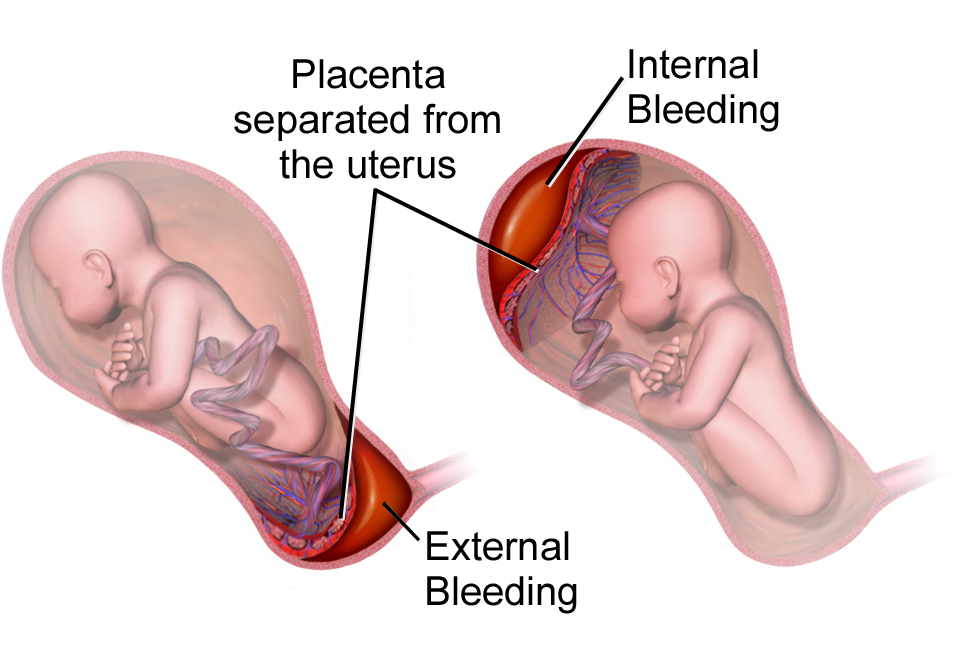
- Drawing of internal and external bleeding from placental abruption
- Specialty: Obstetrics
- Symptoms: Vaginal bleeding, low abdominal pain, dangerously low blood pressure
- Complications: Mother: disseminated intravascular coagulopathy, kidney failure Baby: low birthweight, preterm delivery, stillbirth
- Usual onset: 24 to 26 weeks of pregnancy
- Causes: Unclear
- Risk factors: Smoking, preeclampsia, prior abruption
- Diagnostic method: Based on symptoms, ultrasound
- Differential diagnosis: Placenta previa, bloody show, chorioamnionitis
- Treatment: Bed rest, delivery
- Medication: Corticosteroids
- Frequency: ~0.7% of pregnancies

Placental abruption is when the placenta separates early from the uterus, in other words separates before childbirth. It occurs most commonly around 25 weeks of pregnancy. Symptoms may include vaginal bleeding, lower abdominal pain, and dangerously low blood pressure. Complications for the mother can include disseminated intravascular coagulopathy and kidney failure. Complications for the baby can include fetal distress, low birthweight, preterm delivery, and stillbirth.

The cause of placental abruption is not entirely clear. Risk factors include smoking, pre-eclampsia, prior abruption (the most important and predictive risk factor), trauma during pregnancy, cocaine use, and previous cesarean section. Diagnosis is based on symptoms and supported by ultrasound. It is classified as a complication of pregnancy.

For small abruptions, bed rest may be recommended, while for more significant abruptions or those that occur near term, delivery may be recommended. If everything is stable, vaginal delivery may be tried, otherwise cesarean section is recommended. In those less than 36 weeks pregnant, corticosteroids may be given to speed development of the baby's lungs. Treatment may require blood transfusion or emergency hysterectomy.

Placental abruption occurs in about 1 in 200 pregnancies. Along with placenta previa and uterine rupture, it is one of the most common causes of vaginal bleeding in the later part of pregnancy. Placental abruption is the reason for about 15% of infant deaths around the time of birth. The condition was described at least as early as 1664.

== Signs and symptoms ==
In the early stages of placental abruption, there may be no symptoms. When symptoms develop, they tend to develop suddenly. Common symptoms include:

- sudden-onset abdominal pain
- contractions that seem continuous and do not stop
- vaginal bleeding
- enlarged uterus (disproportionate to the gestational age of the fetus)
- decreased fetal movement
- decreased fetal heart rate.

Vaginal bleeding, if it occurs, may be bright red or dark.

A placental abruption caused by arterial bleeding at the center of the placenta leads to sudden development of severe symptoms and life-threatening conditions, including fetal heart rate abnormalities, severe maternal hemorrhage, and disseminated intravascular coagulation (DIC). Those abruptions caused by venous bleeding at the periphery of the placenta develop more slowly and cause small amounts of bleeding, intrauterine growth restriction, and oligohydramnios (low levels of amniotic fluid).

== Risk factors ==
- Pre-eclampsia
- Chronic hypertension
- Short umbilical cord
- Premature rupture of membranes
- Prolonged rupture of membranes (>24 hours).
- Thrombophilia
- Polyhydramnios
- Multiparity
- Multiple pregnancy
- Maternal age: pregnant women who are younger than 20 or older than 35 are at greater risk

Risk factors for placental abruption include disease, trauma, history, anatomy, and exposure to substances. The risk of placental abruption increases sixfold after severe maternal trauma. Anatomical risk factors include uncommon uterine anatomy (e.g. bicornuate uterus), uterine synechiae, and leiomyoma. Substances that increase the risk of placental abruption include cocaine and tobacco when consumed during pregnancy, especially in the third trimester. A history of placental abruption or previous Caesarean section increases the risk by a factor of 2.3.

== Pathophysiology ==
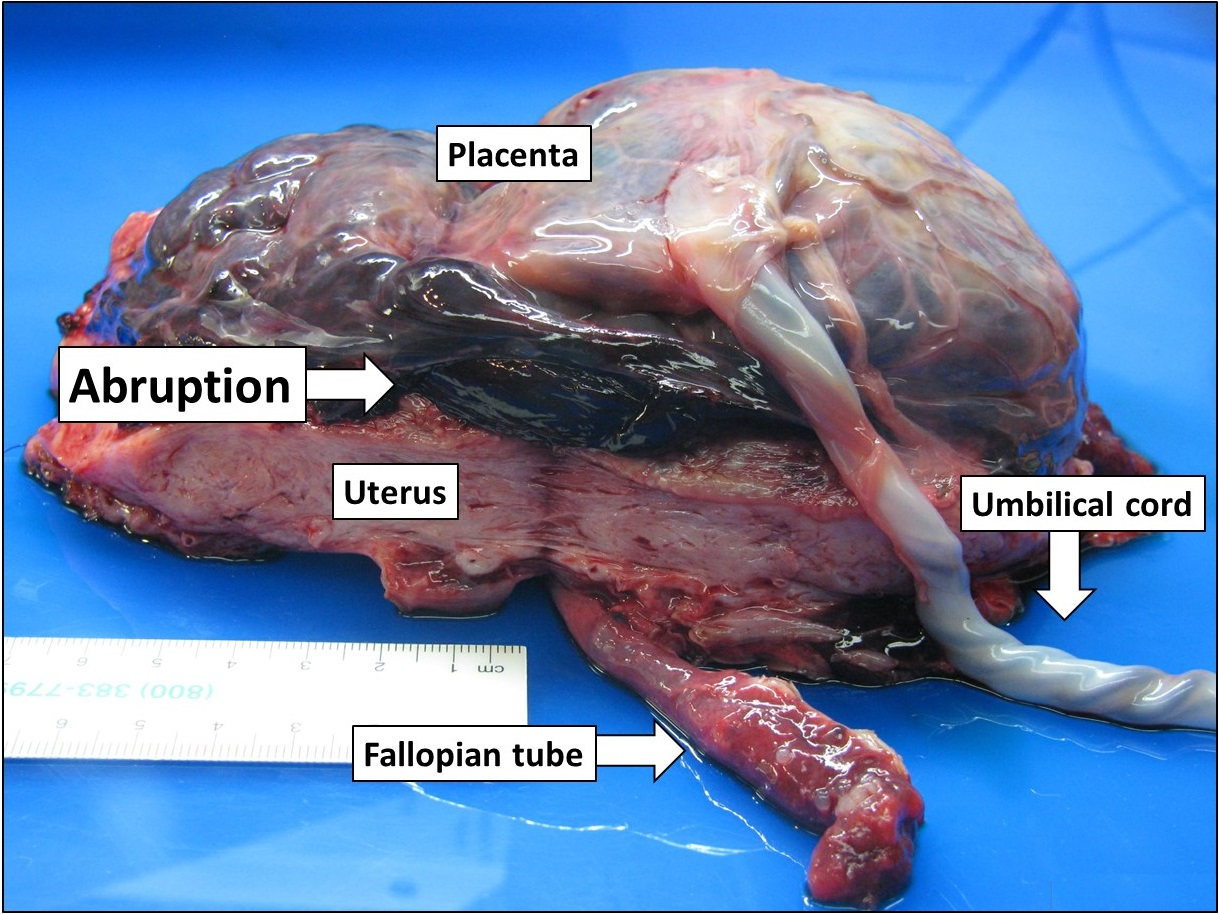
Gross pathology of a uterus which has been opened to show a placental abruption, with a hematoma separating the placenta from the uterus.

In the vast majority of cases, placental abruption is caused by the maternal vessels tearing away from the decidua basalis, not the fetal vessels. The underlying cause is often unknown. A small number of abruptions are caused by trauma that stretches the uterus. Because the placenta is less elastic than the uterus, it tears away when the uterine tissue stretches suddenly. When anatomical risk factors are present, the placenta does not attach in a place that provides adequate support, and it may not develop appropriately or be separated as it grows. Cocaine use during the third trimester has a 10% chance of causing abruption. Though the exact mechanism is not known, cocaine and tobacco cause systemic vasoconstriction, which can severely restrict the placental blood supply (hypoperfusion and ischemia), or otherwise disrupt the vasculature of the placenta, causing tissue necrosis, bleeding, and therefore abruption.

In most cases, placental disease and abnormalities of the spiral arteries develop throughout the pregnancy and lead to necrosis, inflammation, vascular problems, and ultimately, abruption. Because of this, most abruptions are caused by bleeding from the arterial supply, not the venous supply. Production of thrombin via massive bleeding causes the uterus to contract and leads to DIC.

The accumulating blood pushes between the layers of the decidua, pushing the uterine wall and placenta apart. When the placenta is separated, it is unable to exchange waste, nutrients, and oxygen, a necessary function for the fetus's survival. The fetus dies when it no longer receives enough oxygen and nutrients to survive.

== Diagnosis ==
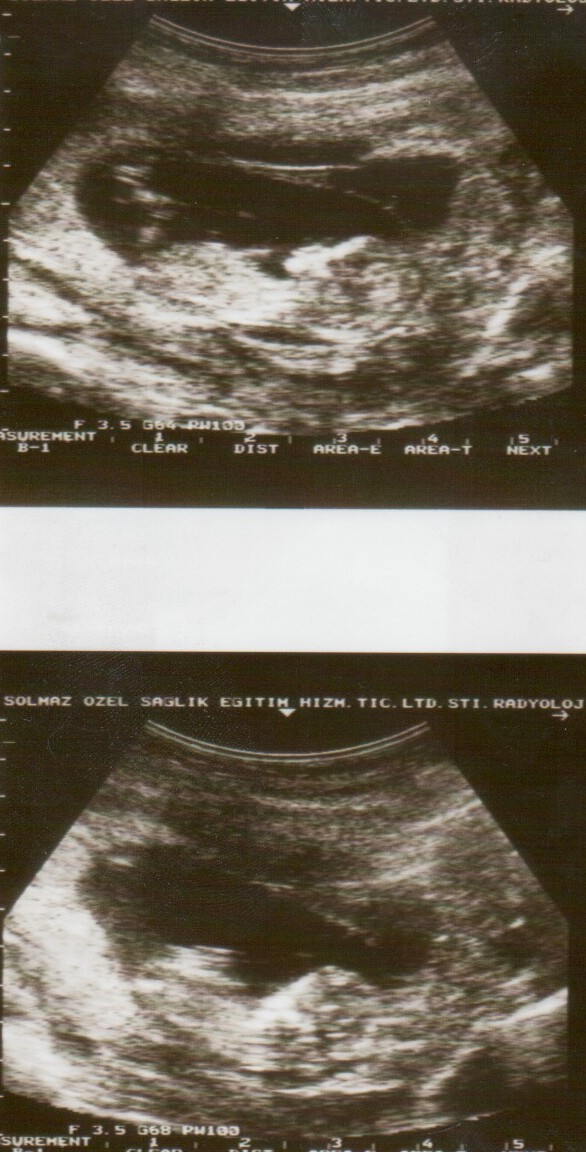
Ultrasound showing placental abruption

Placental abruption is suspected when a pregnant mother has sudden localized abdominal pain with or without bleeding. The fundus may be monitored because a rising fundus can indicate bleeding. An ultrasound may be used to rule out placenta praevia but is not diagnostic for abruption. The diagnosis is one of exclusion, meaning other possible sources of vaginal bleeding or abdominal pain have to be ruled out to diagnose placental abruption. Of note, use of magnetic resonance imaging is highly sensitive in depicting placental abruption, and may be considered if no ultrasound evidence of placental abruption is present, especially if the diagnosis of placental abruption would change management.

=== Classification ===
Based on severity:

- Class 0: Asymptomatic. Diagnosis is made retrospectively by finding an organized blood clot or a depressed area on a delivered placenta.
- Class 1: Mild and represents approximately 48% of all cases. Characteristics include the following:
  - No vaginal bleeding to mild vaginal bleeding
  - Slightly tender uterus
  - Normal maternal blood pressure and heart rate
  - No coagulopathy
  - No fetal distress
- Class 2: Moderate and represents approximately 27% of all cases. Characteristics include the following:
  - No vaginal bleeding to moderate vaginal bleeding
  - Moderate-to-severe uterine tenderness with possible tetanic contractions
  - Maternal tachycardia with orthostatic changes in blood pressure and heart rate
  - Fetal distress
  - Hypofibrinogenemia (i.e., 50–250 mg/dL)
- Class 3: Severe and represents approximately 24% of all cases. Characteristics include the following:
  - No vaginal bleeding to heavy vaginal bleeding
  - Very painful tetanic uterus
  - Maternal shock
  - Hypofibrinogenemia (i.e., <150 mg/dL)
  - Coagulopathy
  - Fetal death

== Prevention ==
Although the risk of placental abruption cannot be eliminated, it can be reduced. Avoiding tobacco, alcohol, and cocaine during pregnancy decreases the risk. Staying away from activities that have a high risk of physical trauma is also important. Women who have high blood pressure or who have had a previous placental abruption and want to conceive must be closely supervised by a doctor.

The risk of placental abruption can be reduced by maintaining a good diet, including taking folate, regular sleep patterns, and correction of pregnancy-induced hypertension.

Use of aspirin before 16 weeks of pregnancy to prevent pre-eclampsia also appears effective at preventing placental abruption.

== Management ==
Treatment depends on the amount of blood loss and the status of the fetus. If the fetus is less than 36 weeks, and neither mother or fetus are in any distress, then they may simply be monitored in hospital until a change in condition or fetal maturity whichever comes first.

Immediate delivery of the fetus may be indicated if the fetus is mature or if the fetus or mother is in distress. Blood volume replacement to maintain blood pressure and blood plasma replacement to maintain fibrinogen levels may be needed. Vaginal birth is usually preferred over Caesarean section unless there is fetal distress. Caesarean section carries an increased risk in cases of disseminated intravascular coagulation. The mother should be monitored for 7 days for postpartum hemorrhage. Excessive bleeding from the uterus may necessitate a hysterectomy. The mother may be given Rhogam if she is Rh negative.

== Prognosis ==
The prognosis of this complication depends on whether the patient receives treatment, the quality of treatment, and the severity of the abruption. Outcomes for the baby also depend on the gestational age.

In the Western world, maternal deaths due to placental abruption are rare. The fetal prognosis is worse than the maternal prognosis; approximately 12% of fetuses affected by placental abruption die. 77% of fetuses that die from placental abruption die before birth; the remainder die due to complications of preterm birth.

Without any form of medical intervention, as often happens in many parts of the world, placental abruption has a high maternal mortality rate.

=== Mother ===
- A large loss of blood may require a blood transfusion.
- If the mother's blood loss cannot be controlled, an emergency hysterectomy may become necessary.
- The uterus may not contract properly after delivery, so the mother may need medication to help her uterus contract.
- The mother may develop a blood clotting disorder, disseminated intravascular coagulation.
- A severe case of shock may affect other organs, such as the liver, kidneys, and pituitary gland. Diffuse cortical necrosis in the kidney is a serious and often fatal complication.
- Placental abruption may cause bleeding through the uterine muscle and into the mother's abdominal cavity, a condition called Couvelaire uterus.
- Maternal death.

=== Baby ===
- The baby may be born at a low birthweight.
- Preterm delivery (before 37 weeks of gestation).
- The baby may be deprived of oxygen and thus develop asphyxia.
- Placental abruption may also result in the death of the baby or stillbirth.
- The newborn infant may have learning issues at later development stages, often requiring professional pedagogical aid.

== Epidemiology ==
Placental abruption occurs in approximately 0.2–1% of all pregnancies. Though different causes change when abruption is most likely to occur, the majority of placental abruptions occur before 37 weeks of gestation, and 12–14% occur before 32 weeks of gestation.
