= Vasa praevia =

Complication of obstetrics

- Other names: Vasa previa
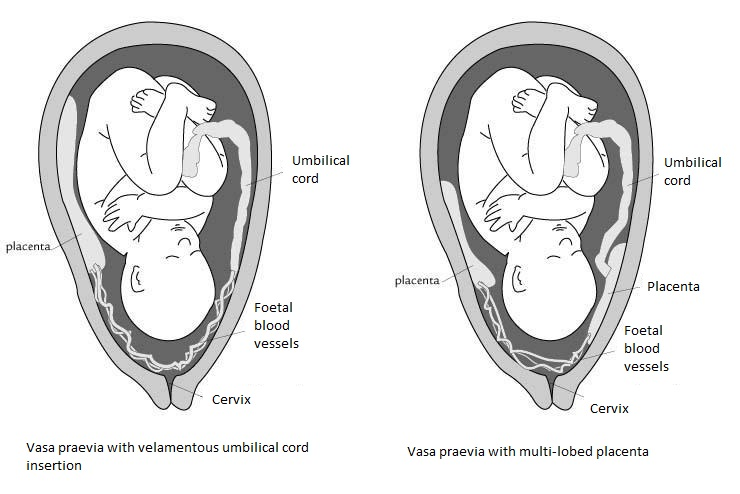
- Specialty: Obstetrics

Vasa praevia or vasa previa is a complication of obstetrics in which fetal blood vessels cross or run near the internal opening of the uterus. Since these vessels are not protected by the umbilical cord or placental tissue, the rupture of the fetal membranes during birth causes them also to rupture, leading rapidly to death of the fetus. The term is derived from the Latin; vasa means "vessels" and praevia comes from pre meaning "before" and via meaning "way". In other words, vessels lie before the fetus in the birth canal and in the way.

Risk factors include low-lying placenta and in vitro fertilization. Vasa praevia occurs in about 0.6 per 1,000 pregnancies.

== Cause ==
In vasa praevia, blood vessels from the fetoplacental circulation lie unprotected on the fetal membranes across or near (within 2 cm) the internal cervical os, either from a velamentous insertion of the umbilical cord or connecting an accessory (succenturiate) lobe of the placenta to its main disk. Observation of patients who had placenta praevia in the second trimester of their pregnancies and later vasa praevia suggests that vasa praevia may arise from placenta praevia that resolves by the placenta growing toward parts of the uterus that are better supplied with blood, the tissue in the lower uterus and over the cervix then atrophying to leave exposed fetal blood vessels.

There are three types of vasa praevia. In Type 1, there is a velamentous insertion with vessels crossing the cervix. In Type 2, the placenta is bilobed or has a succenturiate lobe, with unprotected vessels between the lobes. In Type 3, a portion of the placenta overlying the cervix has atrophied, leaving vessels at a margin exposed.

In vasa praevia, the fetal vessels are not protected by placental or umbilical tissue; when they are ruptured by the rupture of the fetal membrane, the resultant bleeding from the fetoplacental circulation causes rapid fetal exsanguination and fetal death.

=== Risk factors ===
Risk factors for vasa praevia include velamentous insertion of the umbilical cord, placenta praevia in the second trimester of the pregnancy, accessory placental lobes (succenturiate or bilobate placenta), multiple gestation, and assisted reproduction, especially in vitro fertilisation; an estimated 26% of instances are in pregnancies achieved with medical assistance. The reasons for the association between IVF and vasa praevia are not clear, but disturbed orientation of the blastocyst at implantation, vanishing embryos, and the increased frequency of placental morphological variations in IVF pregnancies have all been postulated.

== Diagnosis ==
During delivery, vasa praevia manifests as the classic triad of membrane rupture, painless vaginal bleeding and fetal bradycardia or fetal death.

Prior to the advent of ultrasound, this diagnosis was most often made after a stillbirth or neonatal death in which the mother had ruptured her membranes, had some bleeding, and delivered an exsanguinated baby. In these cases, examination of the placenta and membranes after delivery showed evidence of a velamentous cord insertion with rupture of the vessels. However, with almost universal use of ultrasound in pregnancy in the developed world, many cases are now detected before delivery, giving the opportunity to safely deliver the baby by caesarean section before membrane rupture. Vasa praevia is diagnosed with ultrasound when echolucent linear or circular structures are found overlying the cervix or in close proximity to it. Transvaginal ultrasound is the preferred modality. Color, power and pulsed wave Doppler should be used to confirm that the structures are fetal vessels. The vessels will demonstrate a fetal arterial or venous waveform.

Detection of fetal hemoglobin in vaginal bleeding is also diagnostic. An alkali denaturation test detects its presence, as fetal hemoglobin is resistant to denaturation in presence of 1% NaOH. Tests such as the Ogita Test, Apt test or Londersloot test can be used to detect fetal blood in the vaginal blood. These tests are no longer widely used in the US, but are sometimes used elsewhere.

== Treatment ==
It is recommended that women with vasa praevia should deliver through elective caesarean prior to rupture of the membranes. Since the timing of membrane rupture is difficult to predict, elective cesarean delivery at 35–36 weeks of gestation is recommended. This gestational age gives a reasonable balance between the risk of death and that of prematurity. Several authorities have recommended hospital admission at about 32 weeks, in order to give the patient proximity to the operating room for emergency delivery should the membranes rupture. Because these patients are at risk for preterm delivery, it is recommended that steroids should be given to promote fetal lung maturation. When bleeding occurs, the patient goes into labor, or the membranes rupture, immediate treatment with an emergency caesarean is usually indicated.

== See also ==
- Single umbilical artery
