= Placenta praevia =

- Other names: Placenta previa
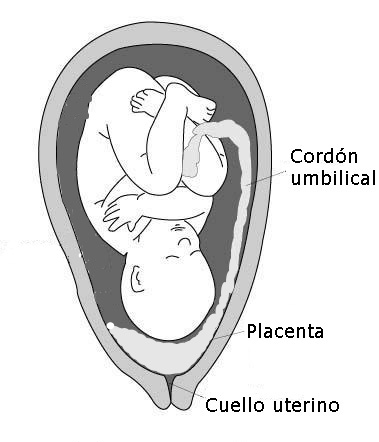
- Diagram showing a placenta praevia (Grade IV)
- Specialty: Obstetrics
- Symptoms: Bright red vaginal bleeding without pain
- Complications: Mother: Bleeding after delivery Baby: Fetal growth restriction
- Usual onset: Second half of pregnancy
- Risk factors: Older age, smoking, prior cesarean section, labor induction, or termination of pregnancy
- Diagnostic method: Ultrasound
- Differential diagnosis: Placental abruption
- Treatment: Bed rest, cesarean section
- Frequency: 0.5% of pregnancies

In placenta praevia (or placenta previa), the placenta attaches inside the uterus in a position that partially or completely covers the cervical opening. Symptoms include vaginal bleeding in the second half of pregnancy. The bleeding is bright red and tends not to be associated with pain. Complications may include placenta accreta, dangerously low blood pressure, or bleeding after delivery. Complications for the baby may include fetal growth restriction.

Risk factors include pregnancy at an older age and smoking as well as prior cesarean section, labor induction, or termination of pregnancy. Diagnosis is by ultrasound. It is classified as a complication of pregnancy.

For those who are less than 36 weeks pregnant with only a small amount of bleeding recommendations may include bed rest and avoiding sexual intercourse. For those after 36 weeks of pregnancy or with a significant amount of bleeding, cesarean section is generally recommended. In those less than 36 weeks pregnant, corticosteroids may be given to speed development of the baby's lungs. Cases that occur in early pregnancy may resolve on their own.

Placenta praevia affects approximately 0.5% of pregnancies. After four cesarean sections, however, it affects 10% of pregnancies. Rates of disease have increased over the late 20th century and early 21st century. The condition was first described in 1685 by Paul Portal.

== Signs and symptoms ==
Women with placenta praevia often present with painless, bright red vaginal bleeding. This commonly occurs around 32 weeks of gestation, but can be as early as late mid-trimester. More than half of women affected by placenta praevia (51.6%) have bleeding before delivery. This bleeding often starts mildly and may increase as the area of placental separation increases. Placenta praevia should be suspected if there is bleeding after 24 weeks of gestation. Bleeding after delivery occurs in about 22% of those affected.

Women may also present as a case of failure of engagement of fetal head.

== Cause ==
The exact cause of placenta praevia is unknown. It is hypothesized to be related to abnormal vascularisation of the endometrium caused by scarring or atrophy from previous trauma, surgery, or infection. These factors may reduce differential growth of lower segment, resulting in less upward shift in placental position as pregnancy advances.

=== Risk factors ===
Risk factors with their odds ratio
Risk factor	Odds ratio
Maternal age ≥ 40 (vs. < 20)	9.1
Illicit drugs	2.8
≥ 1 previous Cesarean section	2.7
Parity ≥ 5 (vs. para 0)	2.3
Parity 2–4 (vs. para 0)	1.9
Smoking	1.6
Congenital anomalies	1.7
Male fetus (vs. female)	1.1
Pregnancy-induced hypertension	0.4

The following have been identified as risk factors for placenta praevia:

- Previous placenta praevia (recurrence rate 4–8%), caesarean delivery, myomectomy or endometrium damage caused by D&C.
- Women who are younger than 20 are at higher risk and women older than 35 are at increasing risk as they get older.
- Women who have had previous pregnancies (multiparity), especially a large number of closely spaced pregnancies, are at higher risk due to uterine damage.
- Smoking during pregnancy; cocaine use during pregnancy
- Women with a large placentae from twins or erythroblastosis are at higher risk.
- Placental pathology (velamentous insertion, succenturiate lobes, bipartite i.e. bilobed placenta etc.)
- Baby is in an unusual position: breech (buttocks first) or transverse (lying horizontally across the womb).
- People with endometriosis may be at a higher risk of suffering from placenta praevia.

Placenta praevia is itself a risk factor of placenta accreta. Alcohol use during pregnancy was previously listed as a risk factor, but is discredited by this article.

=== Classification ===
Traditionally, four grades of placenta praevia were distinguished, but it is now more common to simply differentiate between "major" and "minor" cases.

Type	Description
Minor	Placenta is in lower uterine segment, but the lower edge does not cover the internal os
Major	Placenta is in lower uterine segment, and the lower edge covers the internal os

Other than that, placenta praevia can be also classified as:

Complete: When the placenta completely covers the cervix

Partial: When the placenta partially covers the cervix

Marginal: When the placenta ends near the edge of the cervix, about 2 cm from the internal cervical os

== Diagnosis ==
History may reveal antepartum hemorrhage. Abdominal examination usually finds the uterus non-tender, soft and relaxed. Leopold's maneuvers may find the fetus in an oblique or breech position or lying transverse as a result of the abnormal position of the placenta. Malpresentation is found in about 35% cases. Vaginal examination is avoided in known cases of placenta previa.

=== Confirmatory ===
Previa can be confirmed with an ultrasound. Transvaginal ultrasound has superior accuracy as compared to transabdominal one, thus allowing measurement of the distance between the placenta and cervical os. This has rendered the traditional classification of placenta praevia obsolete.

False positives may be due to following reasons:

- Overfilled bladder compressing lower uterine segment
- Myometrial contraction simulating placental tissue in abnormally low location
- Early pregnancy low position, which in third trimester may be entirely normal due to differential growth of the uterus.

In such cases, repeat scanning is done after an interval of 15–30 minutes.

In parts of the world where ultrasound is unavailable, it is not uncommon to confirm the diagnosis with an examination in the surgical theatre. The proper timing of an examination in theatre is important. If the woman is not bleeding severely she can be managed non-operatively until the 36th week. By this time the baby's chance of survival is as good as at full term.

== Management ==
An initial assessment to determine the status of the mother and fetus is required. Although mothers used to be treated in the hospital from the first bleeding episode until birth, it is now considered safe to treat placenta praevia on an outpatient basis if the fetus is at less than 30 weeks of gestation, and neither the mother nor the fetus are in distress. Immediate delivery of the fetus may be indicated if the fetus is mature or if the fetus or mother are in distress. Blood volume replacement (to maintain blood pressure) and blood plasma replacement (to maintain fibrinogen levels) may be necessary.

Corticosteroids are indicated at 24–34 weeks gestation, given the higher risk of premature birth.

=== Delivery ===
The method of delivery is determined by clinical state of the mother, fetus and ultrasound findings. In minor degrees (traditional grade I and II), vaginal delivery is possible. RCOG recommends that the placenta should be at least 2 cm away from internal os for an attempted vaginal delivery. When a vaginal delivery is attempted, consultant obstetrician and anesthetists are present in delivery suite. In cases of fetal distress and major degrees (traditional grade III and IV) a caesarean section is indicated. Caesarean section is contraindicated in cases of disseminated intravascular coagulation. An obstetrician may need to divide the anterior lying placenta. In such cases, blood loss is expected to be high and thus blood and blood products are always kept ready. In rare cases, hysterectomy may be required.

== Complications ==
=== Maternal ===
- Antepartum hemorrhage
- Malpresentation
- Abnormal placentation
- Postpartum hemorrhage
- Placenta praevia increases the risk of puerperal sepsis and postpartum hemorrhage because the lower segment to which the placenta was attached contracts less well post-delivery.

=== Fetal ===
- IUGR (15% incidence)
- Hypoxia
- Premature delivery
- Death

== Epidemiology ==
Placenta praevia occurs approximately one of every 200 births globally. It has been suggested that rates of placenta praevia are increasing due to increased rates of Caesarean sections. Reasons for regional variation may include ethnicity and diet.

=== Africa ===
Rates of placenta praevia in sub-Saharan Africa are the lowest in the world, averaging 2.7 per 1000 pregnancies. Despite a low prevalence, this disease has had a profound impact in Africa as it is linked with negative outcomes for both the mother and infant. The most common maternal outcome of placenta praevia is extreme blood loss before or after birth (antepartum hemorrhage and postpartum hemorrhage), which is a major cause of maternal and infant mortality in countries like Tanzania. Risk factors for placenta praevia among African women include prior pregnancies, prenatal alcohol consumption, and insufficient gynecologic care. In North Africa placenta praevia rates occur in 6.4 per 1000 pregnancies.

=== Asia ===
Mainland China has the highest prevalence of placenta praevia in the world, measuring at an average of 12.2 per 1000 pregnancies. Specifically, placenta praevia is most common in Southeast Asia, though the reason for this has not yet been investigated. There are many risk factors for placenta praevia in Asian women, of which include pregnancies occurring in women ages 35 and older (advanced maternal age) or in women who have had a prior Caesarean section, having multiple pregnancies, and experiencing either miscarriage or abortion in the past. In comparison with other Asian countries, placenta praevia is more common in Japan (13.9 per 1000) and Korea (15 per 1000). In the Middle East, placenta praevia rates are lower in both Saudi Arabia (7.3 per 1000) and Palestine (4.2 per 1000).

=== Australia ===
The continent with the second highest rates for placenta praevia is Australia, where it affects about 9.5 out of every 1000 pregnant women. Researchers concerned with these rates have tested the specificity and sensitivity of fetal anomaly scans. In conclusion, it was determined the threshold that defines placenta praevia (based on proximity of placenta to cervix) must be reduced in order to improve the accuracy of diagnoses and to avoid false positives leading screenings.

=== Europe ===
Placenta praevia in Europe occurs in about 3.6 per 1000 pregnancies.

=== Latin America ===
In Latin America, placenta praevia occurs in about 5.1 per 1000 pregnancies.

=== North America ===
In North America placenta praevia occurs in 2.9 per 1000 pregnancies. Ethnic differences indicate white women are less likely to experience placenta praevia than black women. Additionally, more cases of placenta praevia are found in women from low-income areas which are linked to insufficient pregnancy care. According to the socioeconomic demographic in North America, black women are more likely to come from low income areas and are thus more likely to develop placenta praevia.

In Nova Scotia, infants born to pregnant woman who experience placenta praevia have a mortality rate 3–4 times higher than normal pregnancies. A couple of factors contribute to this rate, including length of time fetus was in the womb and mother's age. Infants that did survive experienced increased rates of birth defects, breathing problems, and blood abnormalities.

Research suggests that the incidence of placenta praevia in the U.S. is increasing as a result of the increased rate of Caesarean sections.
