= Couvelaire uterus =

- Specialty: Obstetrics

Couvelaire uterus (also known as uteroplacental apoplexy) is a rare and life-threatening condition in which loosening of the placenta (abruptio placentae) causes bleeding that penetrates into the uterine myometrium forcing its way into the peritoneal cavity. This condition makes the uterus very tense and rigid.

== Symptoms and signs ==
Patients can have pain secondary to uterine contractions, uterine tetany or localized uterine tenderness. Signs can also be due to abruptio placentae including uterine hypertonus, fetal distress, fetal death, and rarely, hypovolemic shock (shock secondary to severe blood loss). The uterus may adopt a bluish/purplish, mottled appearance due to extravasation of blood into uterine muscle.

== Pathophysiology ==
Couvelaire uterus is a phenomenon where the retroplacental blood may penetrate through the thickness of the wall of the uterus into the peritoneal cavity. This may occur after abruptio placentae. The hemorrhage that gets into the decidua basalis ultimately splits the decidua, and the haematoma may remain within the decidua or may extravasate into the myometrium (the muscular wall of the uterus). The myometrium becomes weakened and may rupture due to the increase in intrauterine pressure associated with uterine contractions. This may lead to a life-threatening obstetric emergency requiring urgent delivery of the fetus.

== Prevention ==
The occurrence of Couvelaire uterus can be prevented by prevention of abruptio placentae. This includes proper management of hypertensive states of pregnancy; treatment of maternal diseases like diabetes mellitus, and other collagen disease complicating pregnancy; prevention of trauma during pregnancy; mothers should also avoid smoking or consumption of alcohol during pregnancy.

== Treatment ==
The uterus should be evacuated and contractions should be stimulated using intravenous oxytocin; hysterectomy (the removal of the uterus) may be needed in some cases.

== Prognosis ==
The foetus may be compromised if there is prolonged delivery because of the non-contractile uterus; severe bleeding may cause hypovolemic shock in the mother.
