= Velamentous cord insertion =

Velamentous placenta

- Other names: Velamentous Placenta
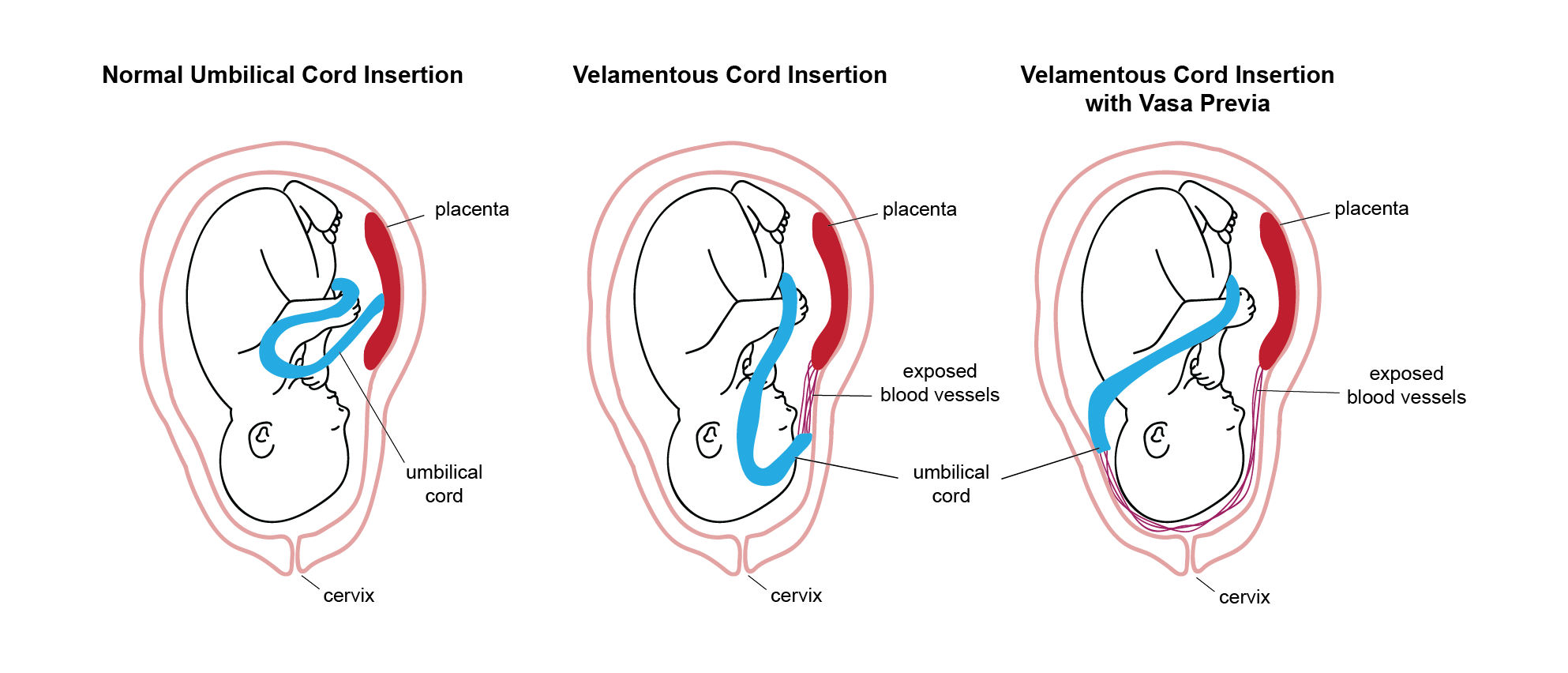
- Normal umbilical cord insertion and velamentous umbilical cord insertion in pregnancy, with and without vasa previa.
- Specialty: Obstetrics
- Symptoms: Blood vessel compression, decrease in blood supply to the fetus, impaired growth and development of the fetus.
- Risk factors: Multiple gestation, placental anomalies previous pregnancy with abnormal cord insertion
- Diagnostic method: Abdominal ultrasound
- Treatment: Caesarean section
- Frequency: 0.1%-1.8% of pregnancies

Velamentous cord insertion is a complication of pregnancy where the umbilical cord is inserted in the fetal membranes. It is a major cause of antepartum hemorrhage that leads to loss of fetal blood and associated with high perinatal mortality. In normal pregnancies, the umbilical cord inserts into the middle of the placental mass and is completely encased by the amniotic sac. The vessels are hence normally protected by Wharton's jelly, which prevents rupture during pregnancy and labor. In velamentous cord insertion, the vessels of the umbilical cord are improperly inserted in the chorioamniotic membrane, and hence the vessels traverse between the amnion and the chorion towards the placenta. Without Wharton's jelly protecting the vessels, the exposed vessels are susceptible to compression and rupture.

The exact cause of velamentous cord insertion is unknown, although risk factors include nulliparity, the use of assisted reproductive technology, maternal obesity, and pregnancy with other placental anomalies. Velamentous cord insertion is often diagnosed using an abdominal ultrasound. This is most successful in the second trimester, however Color Doppler ultrasound or transvaginal ultrasound can be used in difficult cases, such as when the placenta is located posteriorly. If the woman is diagnosed with velamentous cord insertion, the pregnancy is closely monitored, especially as velamentous cord insertion is a strong risk factor for vasa previa, where the exposed vessels cross the cervix and are at high risk of rupture during membrane rupture in early labor. Management strategies for velamentous cord insertion also involve determining the presence of vasa previa. Velamentous cord insertion impacts fetal development during pregnancy by impairing the development of the placenta and modifying the efficiency of placental function. This can manifest in a range of adverse perinatal outcomes, such as fetal growth restriction, placental abruption, abnormal fetal heart rate patterns, and fetal death. Velamentous cord insertion affects between 0.1–1.8% of pregnancies, though its incidence increases ten-fold in multiple pregnancies.

== Signs and symptoms ==
Signs and symptoms of velamentous cord insertion during pregnancy include blood vessel compression, decrease in blood supply to the fetus, and impaired growth and development of the fetus. Blood tests taken in the second trimester may reveal increased levels of serum human chorionic gonadotropin and reduced levels of alpha-fetoprotein. The mother may also experience vaginal bleeding, particularly in the third trimester. Women with velamentous cord insertion may not experience any symptoms throughout pregnancy. During delivery, there may be slow or abnormal fetal heart rate patterns and there may be excessive bleeding or hemorrhage, particularly if the fetal vessels rupture.

== Pathophysiology ==
The exact mechanisms leading to insertion of the umbilical cord in the fetal membranes are unknown, although they are likely to occur in the first trimester. One theory is that velamentous cord insertion may arise from the process of placental trophotropism, which is the phenomenon where the placenta migrates towards areas which have better blood flow with advancing gestation. The placenta grows in regions with better blood supply and portions atrophy in regions of poor blood flow. This process of atrophy may result in the exposure of umbilical blood vessels, causing marginal or peripheral placental insertion to evolve to velamentous insertion over time.

Placentas with velamentous cord insertion have a lower vessel density. As the growth of the fetus is dependent on the organization, mass, and nutrient-transfer capacity of the placenta, fetal development is hence hindered in velamentous cord insertion. This can lead to fetal malformations and low birth weight. The umbilical vessels may also be longer compared to normal, particularly when the site of velamentous cord insertion is in the lower uterine section as the extension of the uterine isthmus as pregnancy advances causes vessel elongation. This results in increased vascular resistance, which impedes nutrient transfer to the fetus.

The umbilical vessels experience increased pressure and compression as they are not protected by Wharton's jelly. This can cause decreased or acute cessation of blood flow, decreased cardiac output, and pulmonary complications in the newborn. The elongated, exposed vessels in lower velamentous cord insertion cases are more readily compressed by the fetus, hence there is an even greater risk of non-reassuring fetal heart rate pattern and emergency caesarean section.

The growth-restricting impacts of placental insufficiency resulting from velamentous cord insertion can also augment the effects of increased pressure to the umbilical vessels. Normally in the second half of pregnancy, one-third of fetal cardiac output is directed towards the placenta. This fraction is reduced to around one-fifth in the last few weeks of pregnancy, while the remaining umbilical blood is recirculated in the fetal body, corresponding with decreased fetal reserves of oxygen. In pregnancies with growth restriction, the fraction of fetal cardiac output distributed to the placenta decreases, further lowering fetal reserves. This can result in increased risk of caesarean delivery, fetal hypoxia, and perinatal death in pregnancies with velamentous cord insertion.

Damage to the umbilical cord vessels can occur when the amniotic membranes are ruptured, particularly in the case of vasa previa, potentially leading to fetal exsanguination. If the umbilical vessels are positioned such that their rupture is likely during labor, an elective operative birth at 35–36 weeks gestation may be planned, and corticosteroids may be administered in order to assist with fetal lung maturation. Overall, velamentous cord insertion doubles the risk of both preterm birth and acute caesarean section.

=== Risk factors ===
The following have been identified as risk factors for velamentous cord insertion:

- Nulliparity
- History of infertility
- The use of assisted reproductive technology
- Multiple gestation
- Maternal smoking
- Maternal asthma
- Maternal obesity
- Chronic hypertension
- Type 1 diabetes
- Gestational diabetes
- Placental anomalies, including low-lying placenta, bilobed placenta, placenta with accessory lobe/s
- Previous pregnancy with abnormal cord insertion
- Having an umbilical cord with a single umbilical artery
- Advanced maternal age

== Diagnosis ==
Abdominal ultrasound can be used to visualize the insertion site of the umbilical cord. Overall, visualization is most successful in the second trimester, however routine ultrasound examination in the second trimester may not detect velamentous cord insertion if the condition develops after the remodelling of the placenta as gestation advances. Visualization becomes increasingly difficult in the third trimester as the fetus may obscure the insertion site.

The umbilical cord and its insertion site may be obscured by the fetus, such as in posterior placenta or in low-lying placenta, or may be difficult to visualise due to conditions such as maternal obesity. In these cases, the use of Color Doppler ultrasound or transvaginal ultrasound can enhance the visualization of the umbilical cord, and are able to diagnose velamentous cord insertion at 18–20 weeks.

== Management ==
If velamentous cord insertion is diagnosed, fetal growth is assessed every four weeks using ultrasound beginning at 28 weeks. If intrauterine growth restriction is observed, the umbilical cord is also assessed for signs of compression. Non-stress tests may be performed twice a week to ensure adequate blood flow to the fetus. The amniotic fluid may be frequently assessed for high levels of inflammatory markers such as interleukin-6 which can indicate intra-amniotic inflammation.

Upon diagnosis of velamentous cord insertion, transvaginal ultrasound with Color Doppler may also be performed to determine whether any of the exposed vessels are within two centimeters (or five centimeters, a more common threshold recently) of the internal cervical os. If such vessels are identified, vasa previa may be present and cervical length is measured every week to determine the risk of premature rupture of membranes.

Women diagnosed with velamentous cord insertion may also receive counselling about the condition, its risks, and potential courses of action, including preterm delivery or caesarean delivery.

The newborn may be delivered via normal vaginal labor if there are no signs of fetal distress. Fetal heart rate is continuously monitored for slow or abnormal heart rate patterns which may indicate fetal distress during labor. If the exposed blood vessels are near the cervix or are at risk of rupturing, the newborn may be delivered via caesarean section as early as 35 weeks gestation.

== Complications ==
=== Maternal ===
- Vasa previa
- Rupture of the vessels and membranes
- Small placenta
- Low arterial cord pH
- Vascular thrombosis
- Intrapartum bleeding
- Umbilical cord avulsion
- Need for caesarean delivery, curettage, manual extraction of the placenta
- Placental abruption
- Postpartum hemorrhage

=== Fetal ===
- Prematurity
- Abnormal heart rate patterns
- Low birth weight
- Newborn/s small for gestational age
- Low Apgar score
- Fetal hypoxia
- Pulmonary complications
- Fetal malformations
- Fetal bleeding
- Death

In twins, one or both of the fetuses may have velamentous cord insertion, which can lead to birth-weight discordance, where one twin weighs significantly more at birth than the other, and selective fetal growth restriction. These complications particularly arise in the case of monochorionic twins, where identical twins share the same placenta.

== Epidemiology ==
Velamentous cord insertion occurs in between 0.1%-1.8% of all pregnancies, and is eight to ten times more frequent in multiple pregnancies. This risk is doubled in the case of monochorionic twins, and tripled in the case of fetal growth restriction. It is thought that sex may be a determinant of abnormal cord insertions, however there is conflicting evidence as to whether male or female fetuses are linked to greater risk of velamentous cord insertion.
