= Single umbilical artery =

- Cross-section of an umbilical cord with a single artery
- Specialty: Obstetrics, maternal–fetal medicine

Occasionally, during pregnancy, there is a single umbilical artery (SUA) present in the umbilical cord, as opposed to the usual two. This is sometimes also called a two-vessel umbilical cord, or two-vessel cord. Approximately, this affects between 1 in 100 and 1 in 500 pregnancies, making it the most common umbilical abnormality. Its cause is not known.

Normal cords have one vein (left umbilical vein) and two arteries. The vein carries oxygenated blood from the placenta to the baby and the arteries carry deoxygenated blood from the baby to the placenta. In approximately 1% of pregnancies there are only two vessels —usually a single vein and single artery. In about 75% of those cases, the baby is entirely normal and healthy. One artery can support a pregnancy and does not necessarily indicate problems. For the other 25%, a 2-vessel cord is a sign that the baby has other abnormalities—sometimes life-threatening and sometimes not.

Doctors and midwives often suggest parents take the added precaution of having regular growth scans near term to rule out intrauterine growth restriction, which can happen on occasion and warrant intervention. Yet the majority of growth restricted infants with the abnormality also have other defects. Finally, neonates with the finding may also have a higher occurrence of renal problems, therefore close examination of the infant may be warranted shortly after birth. Among SUA infants, there is a slightly elevated risk for post-natal urinary infections.

== Presentation ==
=== Associations ===
SUA does increase the risk of the baby having cardiac, skeletal, intestinal or renal problems. Babies with SUA may have a higher likelihood of having other congenital abnormalities, especially of the heart. However, additional testing (high level ultrasound scans) can rule out many of these abnormalities prior to birth and alleviate parental anxiety.

It may be associated with Trisomy 18, also known as Edwards syndrome. Intrauterine growth restriction has been found to be associated.

== Diagnosis ==
It can be detected in the first trimester of pregnancy with the use of 2D ultrasound. The sonographer is able to identify a 2 vessel cord in an image with the bladder and color Doppler, which will show only one artery going around one side of the bladder. In a normal fetus, there would be 2 arteries (one on each side of the bladder). Echocardiograms of the fetus may be advised to ensure the heart is functioning properly. Genetic counseling may be useful, too, especially when weighing the pros and cons of more invasive procedures such as chorionic villus sampling and amniocentesis. These invasive procedures are usually performed when there is a suspected chromosomal abnormality or genetic defect and will confirm a diagnosis.

== Prognosis ==
Although the presence of an SUA is a risk factor for additional complications, most fetuses with the condition will not experience other problems, either in utero or after birth. Especially encouraging are cases in which no other soft markers for congenital abnormalities are visible via ultrasound. Given that, the vast majority of expectant mothers do not receive the kind of advanced ultrasound scanning required to confirm SUA in utero.

== Epidemiology ==
It is slightly more common in multiple births, in infants with chromosome anomalies, and in girls than in boys.

== See also ==
- Umbilical cord
