= Placenta accreta spectrum =

Placenta accreta
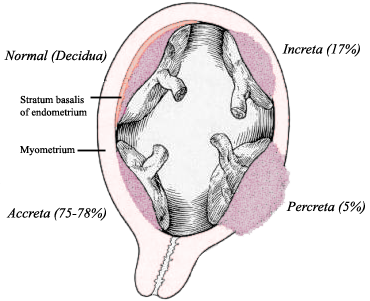
- Types of placenta accreta and their prevalence.
- Specialty: Obstetrics

Placenta accreta spectrum (PAS), also called morbidly adherent placenta is a medical condition that occurs when all or part of the placenta attaches abnormally to the myometrium (the muscular layer of the uterine wall) during pregnancy. This condition was first documented in medical literature in 1927. Three grades are defined by the International Federation of Gynecology and Obstetrics (FIGO), which were initially named accreta, increta, and percreta in order of severity.

Because of abnormal attachment to the myometrium, PAS is associated with an increased risk of massive hemorrhaging, heavy bleeding, at the time of attempted vaginal delivery. This leads many to deliver through a caesarean section. The need for transfusion of blood products is frequent, and a surgical removal of the uterus (hysterectomy) is sometimes required to control life-threatening bleeding.

Rates of placenta accreta are increasing, and are even higher in developing countries. A 2016 study found that placenta accreta affected 1 in 272 women with a birth-related hospital discharge diagnosis in the US. Furthermore, the increase in PAS prevalence over decades has been a major cause of morbidity and mortality among pregnant women, and has been a main factor in the increase of caesarean deliveries.

== Pathogenesis ==
The pathogenesis of PAS includes the formation of an abnormally firm and deep attachment to the uterine wall by the placenta. In addition, there may be an absence of the decidua basalis and incomplete development of the Nitabuch's layer.

Below are the three forms of placenta accreta spectrum, distinguishable by the depth of penetration into the uterine wall.

| Type | Fraction | Description |
|---|---|---|
| Placenta accreta | 75–78% | The placenta chorionic villi attaches strongly to the myometrium, rather than being restricted within the decidua basalis; however, it does not penetrate it. This form of the condition accounts for around 75% of all cases. |
| Placenta increta | 17% | Occurs when the placenta chorionic villi invades into the myometrium. |
| Placenta percreta | 5–7% | The highest-risk form of the condition occurs when the placenta chorionic villi penetrates the entire myometrium, and invades through the perimetrium (uterine serosa) to the uterine wall. This variant can lead to the placenta attaching to other organs such as the rectum or urinary bladder. |

Women experience higher morbidity with placenta percreta compared to placenta accreta and increta. In cases of placenta percreta, where the uterus is deeply penetrated into and through the myometrium to the bladder or rectum, it is highly advised to avoid any attempts of removing the placenta. Leaving the placenta in situ, not removing it after childbirth, has been part of the conservative management of PAS discussed later.

== Diagnosis ==
When the antepartum diagnosis of placenta accreta is made, it is usually based on ultrasound findings in the second or third trimester. Sonographic findings that may be suggestive of placenta accreta include:

- Loss of normal hypo-echoic retroplacental zone
- Multiple vascular lacunae (irregular vascular spaces) within placenta, giving "Swiss cheese" appearance
- Blood vessels or placental tissue bridging uterine-placental margin, myometrial-bladder interface, or crossing the uterine serosa
- Retroplacental myometrial thickness of <1 mm
- Numerous coherent vessels visualized with 3-dimensional power Doppler in basal view

The diagnosis is not easy and is affected by a significant interobserver variability; failure to diagnose and misdiagnosis are common. In doubtful cases it is possible to perform a nuclear magnetic resonance (MRI) of the pelvis, which has a very good sensitivity and specificity for this disorder. MRI findings associated with placenta accreta include dark T2 bands, bulging of the uterus, and loss of the dark T2 interface. Although there are isolated case reports of placenta accreta being diagnosed in the first trimester or at the time of abortion < 20 weeks' gestational age, the predictive value of first-trimester ultrasound for this diagnosis remains unknown. Women with a placenta previa or "low-lying placenta" overlying a uterine scar early in pregnancy should undergo follow-up imaging in the third trimester with attention to the potential presence of placenta accreta. Despite the difficulty in diagnosing PAS, there exists many risk factors that can aid in the diagnosis.

== Risk factors ==
An important risk factor for placenta accreta is placenta previa in the presence of a uterine scar. Placenta previa is an independent risk factor for placenta accreta. Additional reported risk factors for placenta accreta include maternal age and multiparity, other prior uterine surgery, prior uterine curettage, uterine irradiation, endometrial ablation, Asherman syndrome, uterine leiomyomata, uterine anomalies, and smoking.

Any anomaly in the uterine wall, whether superficial or deep, can lead to PAS, as that anomaly assists the blastocyst to implant onto the uterine wall at that location. Incidence of the condition is increased by the presence of scar tissue such as Asherman's syndrome from past uterine surgery, especially from a past dilation and curettage, (which is used for many indications including miscarriage, induced abortion, and postpartum hemorrhage), myomectomy, or caesarean section. Caesarean deliveries have been deemed the main factor for women to develop PAS and placenta previa due to the tissue scarring from the delivery. Almost a third of all births in the United States are by caesarean section. A systemic review found that caesarean deliveries increased the incidence of placenta previa. Furthermore, women who had placenta previa and at least 3 caesarean deliveries were statistically more likely to develop placenta accreta than those with previa and no history of caesarean deliveries.

A thin decidua can also be a contributing factor to such trophoblastic invasion. Some studies suggest that the rate of incidence is higher when the fetus is female. Other risk factors include low-lying placenta, anterior placenta, congenital or acquired uterine defects (such as uterine septa), leiomyoma, ectopic implantation of placenta (including cornual pregnancy).

Pregnant women above 35 years of age who have had a caesarian section and now have a placenta previa overlying the uterine scar have a 40% chance of placenta accreta, which comes with any complications.

== Complications of PAS ==
- Damage to local organs (e.g., bowel, bladder, uterus and neurovascular structures in the retroperitoneum and lateral pelvic sidewalls from placental implantation and its removal)
- Postoperative bleeding requiring repeated surgery
- Amniotic fluid embolism
- Complications (such as dilutional coagulopathy, consumptive coagulopathy, acute transfusion reactions, transfusion-associated lung injury, acute respiratory distress syndrome, and electrolyte abnormalities) caused by transfusion of large volumes of blood products, crystalloids, and other volume expanders
- Postoperative thromboembolism, infection, multisystem organ failure, and maternal death.

The exact incidence of maternal mortality related to placenta accreta and its complications is unknown, but it is significant, especially if the urinary bladder is involved.

== Treatment and management ==
=== Treatment ===
Treatment may be delivery by caesarean section and abdominal hysterectomy if placenta accreta is diagnosed before birth. Oxytocin and antibiotics are used for post-surgical management. When there is partially separated placenta with focal accreta, removal of placenta may be reasonable if maternal status is stable. If it is important to save the woman's uterus (for future pregnancies) then resection around the placenta may be successful. Conservative treatment can also be uterus sparing but may not be as successful and has a higher risk of complications. Techniques include:

- Leaving the placenta in the uterus and curettage of uterus. Methotrexate has been used in this case.
- Intrauterine balloon catheterization to compress blood vessels
- Embolisation of pelvic vessels
- Internal iliac artery ligation
- Bilateral uterine artery ligation

In cases where there is invasion of placental tissue and blood vessels into the bladder, it is treated in similar manner to abdominal pregnancy and manual placental removal is avoided. However, this may eventually need hysterectomy and/or partial cystectomy.

If the patient decides to proceed with a vaginal delivery, blood products for transfusion and an anesthesiologist are kept ready at delivery.

=== Conservative management ===
Conservative management of PAS is an approach used to avoid a hysterectomy, total removal of the uterus. Leaving the placenta in situ and not removing it has been the main approach, specifically for those experiencing placenta percreta, as findings suggest that it can mitigate the high hemorrhage or tissue injury risk that can be caused by a hysterectomy. Furthermore, this is a more practical approach for mothers who want to bear more children in the future.

Although this approach has been successful, findings have shown that leaving the placenta in situ has posed some negative effects, including delayed hemorrhage, endomyometritis, and sepsis (a systemic infection that can lead to organ dysfunction). Systematic reviews have shown a variety of ranges regarding outcome percentages of women with placenta in situ:

- 61% experienced late complications
- 22-58% required hysterectomy
- 60-65% needed additional procedures
- 51% experienced postpartum hemorrhage
- 42% experienced major morbidity
- 78% retained their uterus

As mentioned earlier, methotrexate has been used to assist in placenta re-absorption in cases of placenta in situ. It has shown success in helping to decrease the vascularity of the uterus after pregnancy. However, women on methotrexate can not breastfeed, which can negatively impact maternal bonding, neonatal attachment, and postpartum depression.

Conservative management, in which the placenta is left in situ, requires consideration of both short- and long-term risks and prolonged postoperative monitoring. Appropriate counseling is recommended before this approach is undertaken. Although the approach carries potential risks, carefully monitored conservative management has been associated with favorable outcomes in some cases of placenta accreta spectrum (PAS).

== Health inequalities ==
There does not exist much research regarding health inequalities related to women with Placenta Accreta Spectrum (PAS). However, majority of research present has discovered that there is no difference in health inequalities within PAS maternal outcomes for neonatal morbidity, timing of diagnosis, and planned multidisciplinary care, among different racial and ethnic groups. This remained true even after data was adjusting for factors such as income, age, institution and BMI. Furthermore, there has been found that there is no correlation between social vulnerability and morbidity associated with PAS.

The lack of ethnic and racial health inequalities and social vulnerability in relation to PAS is good news; however, research needs to be conducted to discover if other factors such as income, socioeconomic status, and access to healthcare can lead to PAS health inequalities. This research will be beneficial especially for vulnerable populations, such as migrants, since they are exposed to factors that could lead to poorer pregnancy outcomes.

== Epidemiology ==
The reported incidence of placenta accreta has increased from approximately 0.8 per 1000 deliveries in the 1980s to 3 per 1000 deliveries in the past decade.

Reported incidence has been increasing with increased rates of caesarean deliveries, with rates of 1 in 4,027 pregnancies in the 1970s, 1 in 2,510 in the 1980s, and 1 in 533 for 1982–2002. In 2002, ACOG estimated that incidence had increased 10-fold over the past 50 years. The risk of placenta accreta in future deliveries after cesarean section is 0.4-0.8%. For patients with placenta previa, risk increases with number of previous cesarean sections, with rates of 3%, 11%, 40%, 61%, and 67% for the first, second, third, fourth, and fifth or greater number of cesarean sections. A 2016 study found that placenta accreta affected 1 in 272 women with a birth-related hospital discharge diagnosis in the US, higher than any previous published study.

Information on the frequency of development of placenta accreta and its complications is not collected. In 2026 it was reported that studies in the US and Israel suggested a prevalence as high as one in 111 of all pregnant women.

It is extremely important for pregnant women to be aware of this condition, its risk factors, treatment and management, to ensure their health and the health of their baby, and prevent complications throughout the pregnancy.
