= Wharton's jelly =

Gelatinous substance within the umbilical cord

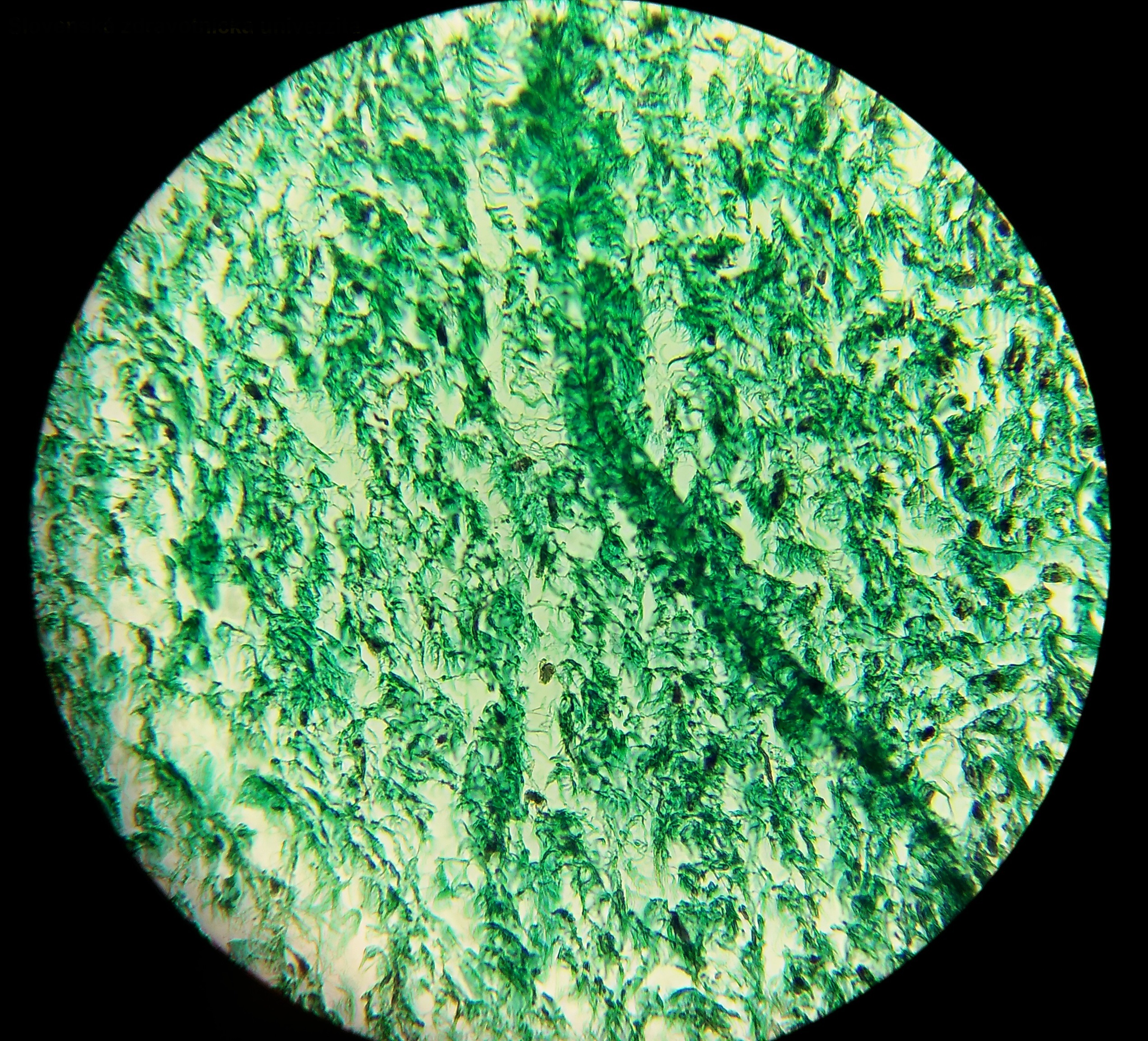
Wharton's jelly - trichrome stain

Wharton's jelly (Latin: substantia gelatinea funiculi umbilicalis) is a gelatinous substance within the umbilical cord, largely made up of mucopolysaccharides (hyaluronic acid and chondroitin sulfate). It acts as a mucous connective tissue containing some fibroblasts and macrophages, and is derived from extra-embryonic mesoderm of the connecting stalk.

== Umbilical cord occlusion ==
As a mucous connective tissue, it is rich in proteoglycans, and protects and insulates umbilical blood vessels. Wharton's jelly, when exposed to temperature changes, collapses structures within the umbilical cord and thus provides a physiological clamping of the cord, typically three minutes after birth.

== Stem cells ==
Cells in Wharton's jelly express several stem cell genes, including telomerase. They can be extracted, cultured, and induced to differentiate into mature cell types such as chondrocytes and adipocytes. Wharton's jelly is therefore a potential source of adult stem cells, often collected from cord blood.

== Etymology ==
It is named for the English physician and anatomist Thomas Wharton (1614–1673) who first described it in his publication Adenographia, or "The Description of the Glands of the Entire Body", first published in 1656.

== Isolation of stem cells protocol ==
After obtaining the umbilical cord from the donor, it is transported to the laboratory in a cold and sterile environment using a transfer buffer that contains phosphate buffered saline (PBS). Subsequently, the vessels should be eliminated from the umbilical cord tissue on a sterile plate with the aid of autoclaved scissors. The sections of the umbilical cord tissue that are devoid of arteries should then be fragmented into smaller fragments. These tissue fragments are subsequently placed in a sterile cell culture plate or cell culture flask, and the cell culture medium (enriched with fetal bovine serum and antibiotics) is added. Lastly, the flask containing the tissue fragments is placed in a CO_{2} incubator for a duration of 1-2 weeks. This process ultimately leads to the proliferation and migration of stem cells from the Wharton's jelly into the plate or flask.

== Clinical significance ==
There is a rare pathology known as edema of Wharton’s jelly. Its causes have not been established. In some cases, the development of edema is associated with fetal hydrops. In addition, edema may occur in cases of umbilical cord hemangiomas. In such cases, the risk of compression of the umbilical cord vessels increases, which may lead to impaired blood supply to the fetus. Wharton’s jelly edema is usually detected in the second half of pregnancy. The edema may involve the entire umbilical cord or only certain segments of it. In addition to edema, pathologies of Wharton’s jelly include mucoid degeneration accompanied by the formation of pseudocysts, as well as underdevelopment and constriction (coarctation) of the umbilical cord.

A 2015 study showed that transplantation of Wharton’s jelly tissue may be considered as a strategy for the treatment of traumatic brain injury.

== Marketing ==
A 2024 editorial described a direct-to-consumer marketing email from a company in Arizona advertising a "3 for 1" sale on Exosomes or Whartons Jelly. The email stated that the products are "manufactured in an FDA-registered, cGMP compliant, ISO certified lab", but did not mention that such birth products can be used only in a registered clinical trial, according to a directive from the United States Food and Drug Administration on May 31, 2021.
