= Umbilical cord =

Conduit between embryo/fetus and the placenta

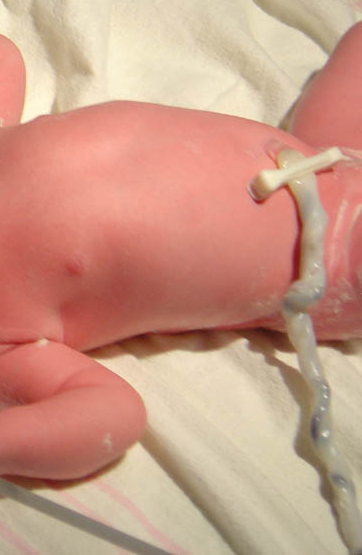
- Umbilical cord of a three-minute-old baby. A medical clamp has been applied.

Details

Identifiers
- Latin: funiculus umbilicalis
- MeSH: D014470
- TE: cord_by_E6.0.2.2.0.0.1 E6.0.2.2.0.0.1

In placental mammals, the umbilical cord (also called the navel string, birth cord or funiculus umbilicalis) is a conduit between the developing embryo or fetus and the placenta. During prenatal development, the umbilical cord is physiologically and genetically part of the fetus and (in humans) normally contains two arteries (the umbilical arteries) and one vein (the umbilical vein), buried within Wharton's jelly. The umbilical vein supplies the fetus with oxygenated, nutrient-rich blood from the placenta. Conversely, the fetal heart pumps low-oxygen, nutrient-depleted blood through the umbilical arteries back to the placenta.

== Structure and development ==
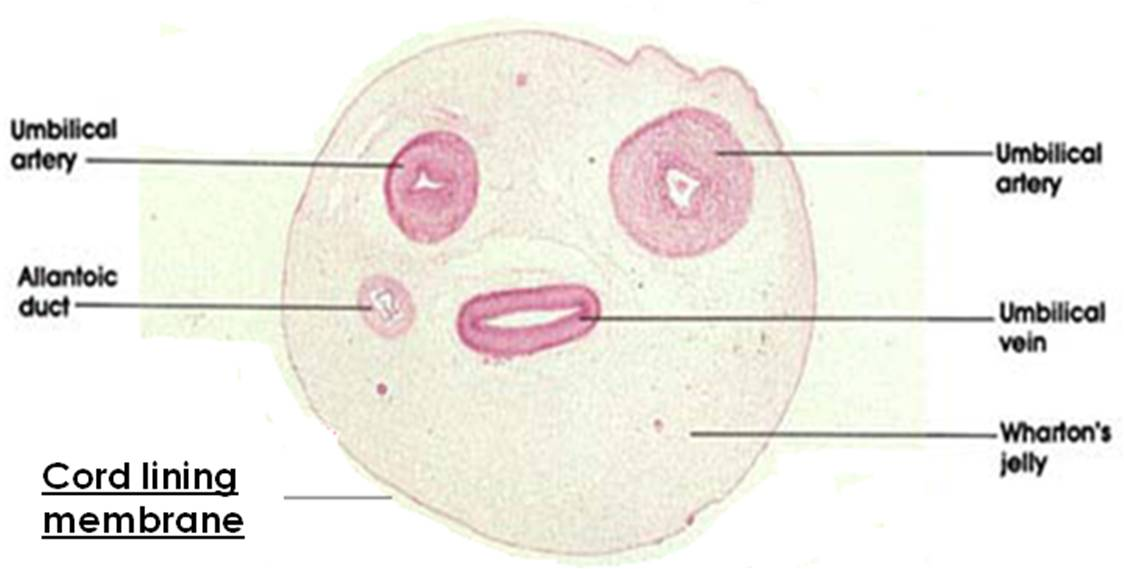
Cross-sectional micrograph of the human umbilical cord. H&E stain. Labelled allantoic duct is also known as the urachus.

Vaginal ultrasonography of an embryo of a gestational age of eight weeks and three days. The embryo is surrounded by the thin membranes of the amniotic sac, the umbilical cord is seen in the center, attaching the embryo to the placenta.

The umbilical cord develops from and contains remnants of the yolk sac and allantois. It forms by the fifth week of development, replacing the yolk sac as the source of nutrients for the embryo. The cord is not directly connected to the mother's circulatory system, but instead joins the placenta, which transfers materials to and from the maternal blood without allowing direct mixing. The length of the umbilical cord is approximately equal to the crown-rump length of the fetus throughout pregnancy. The umbilical cord in a full-term newborn is usually about 50 centimeters (20 inches) long and about 2 centimeters (0.79 in) in diameter. This diameter decreases rapidly within the placenta. The fully patent umbilical artery has two main layers: an outer layer consisting of circularly arranged smooth muscle cells and an inner layer which shows rather irregularly and loosely arranged cells embedded in abundant ground substance staining metachromatic. The smooth muscle cells of the layer are rather poorly differentiated, contain only a few tiny myofilaments and are thereby unlikely to contribute actively to the process of post-natal closure.

The umbilical cord can be detected by ultrasound by six weeks of gestation and well-visualized by eight to nine weeks of gestation.

The umbilical cord lining is a good source of mesenchymal and epithelial stem cells. Umbilical cord mesenchymal stem cells (UC-MSC) have been used clinically to treat osteoarthritis, autoimmune diseases, and multiple other conditions. Their advantages include a better harvesting, and multiplication, and immunosuppressive properties that define their potential for use in transplantations. Their use would also overcome the ethical objections raised by the use of embryonic stem cells.

The umbilical cord contains Wharton's jelly, a gelatinous substance made largely from mucopolysaccharides that protects the blood vessels inside. It contains one vein, which carries oxygenated, nutrient-rich blood to the fetus, and two arteries that carry deoxygenated, nutrient-depleted blood away. Occasionally, only two vessels (one vein and one artery) are present in the umbilical cord. This is sometimes related to fetal abnormalities, but it may also occur without accompanying problems.

It is unusual for a vein to carry oxygenated blood and for arteries to carry blood with a lower oxygen content (other examples being the pulmonary veins and arteries, connecting the lungs to the heart). However, this naming convention reflects the fact that the umbilical vein carries blood towards the fetus' heart, while the umbilical arteries carry blood away. The systemic arterial blood of the fetus is also a mixture of systemic venous blood (oxygen poor) and umbilical venous blood (oxygen rich) and thus does not have the same oxygen content as systemic arterial blood after birth or in the adult.

The blood flow through the umbilical cord is approximately 35 ml / min at 20 weeks, and 240 ml / min at 40 weeks of gestation. Adapted to the weight of the fetus, this corresponds to 115 ml / min / kg at 20 weeks and 64 ml / min / kg at 40 weeks.

The proximal part of an umbilical cord refers to the segment closest to the embryo or fetus, and to the placenta, and opposite the distal part.

== Function ==
=== Connection to fetal circulatory system ===
The umbilical cord enters the fetus via the abdomen, at the point which (after separation) will become the navel (umbilicus or belly button). Within the fetus, the umbilical vein continues towards the transverse fissure of the liver (porta hepatis), where it splits into two. One of these branches joins with the hepatic portal vein (connecting to its left branch), which carries blood into the liver. The second branch (known as the ductus venosus) bypasses the liver and flows into the inferior vena cava, which carries blood towards the heart. The two umbilical arteries branch from the internal iliac arteries and pass on either side of the bladder into the umbilical cord, completing the circuit back to the placenta.

=== Gas exchange ===
The umbilical cord lacks vasa vasorum, which means that the cells within Wharton's Jelly are dependent on the diffusion of gases and nutrients for their metabolic needs. It has been hypothesized that this diffusion might explain the persistence of the dual umbilical artery, while the second umbilical vein atrophies early in gestation. The dual umbilical artery increases the surface area of the arterial walls (and therefore the rate of diffusion) by roughly 45% compared to a single umbilical artery, while the same placental flow is maintained. This might provide a threefold protective mechanism against the effect of uterine contractions during childbirth. These contractions disrupt the maternal blood flow towards the placenta, and therefore might result in potentially harmful fetal acidosis. During a uterine contraction, flow through the umbilical cord, and thus diffusion with Wharton's Jelly, is maintained. Firstly, Wharton's jelly acts as an oxygen reserve, which delays the onset of anaerobic metabolism, ultimately delaying the onset of fetal acidosis. Secondly, the diffusion of carbon dioxide from the fetal blood into Wharton's jelly dampens the increase of acidity in the fetal blood, delaying the onset of acidosis as well. Finally, the diffusion of carbon dioxide back into the arterial blood after the uterine contraction accelerates fetal recovery, as it raises the carbon dioxide content of the fetal blood entering the placenta. In the placenta, this increase in carbon dioxide increases the uptake of oxygen from the maternal blood as a result of the Bohr effect. In turn, this increased amount of oxygen increases the rate at which carbon dioxide is removed from the fetal tissues, as a result of the Haldane effect. Since all three effects are proportional to the diffusion rate, the protective properties are reduced for fetuses with a single umbilical artery, which provides an explanation for the increased amount of complications seen for these fetuses during childbirth.

=== Changes after birth ===
After birth, the umbilical cord stump will dry up and drop away by the time the baby is three weeks old. If the stump still has not separated after three weeks, it might be a sign of an underlying problem, such as an infection or immune system disorder.

In absence of external interventions, the umbilical cord occludes physiologically shortly after birth, explained both by a swelling and collapse of Wharton's jelly in response to a reduction in temperature and by vasoconstriction of the blood vessels by smooth muscle contraction. In effect, a natural clamp is created, halting the flow of blood. In air at 18 °C, this physiological clamping will take three minutes or less. In water birth, where the water temperature is close to body temperature, normal pulsation can be five minutes and longer.

Closure of the umbilical artery by vasoconstriction consists of multiple constrictions which increase in number and degree with time. There are segments of dilations with trapped uncoagulated blood between the constrictions before complete occlusion. Both the partial constrictions and the ultimate closure are mainly produced by muscle cells of the outer circular layer. In contrast, the inner layer seems to serve mainly as a plastic tissue which can easily be shifted in an axial direction and then folded into the narrowing lumen to complete the closure. The vasoconstrictive occlusion appears to be mainly mediated by serotonin and thromboxane A_{2}. The arteries in cords of preterm infants contract more to angiotensin II and arachidonic acid and are more sensitive to oxytocin than in term ones. In contrast to the contribution of Wharton's jelly, cooling causes only temporary vasoconstriction.

Within the child, the umbilical vein and ductus venosus close up, and degenerate into fibrous remnants known as the round ligament of the liver and the ligamentum venosum respectively. Part of each umbilical artery closes up (degenerating into what are known as the medial umbilical ligaments), while the remaining sections are retained as part of the circulatory system.

== Clinical significance ==
=== Problems and abnormalities ===
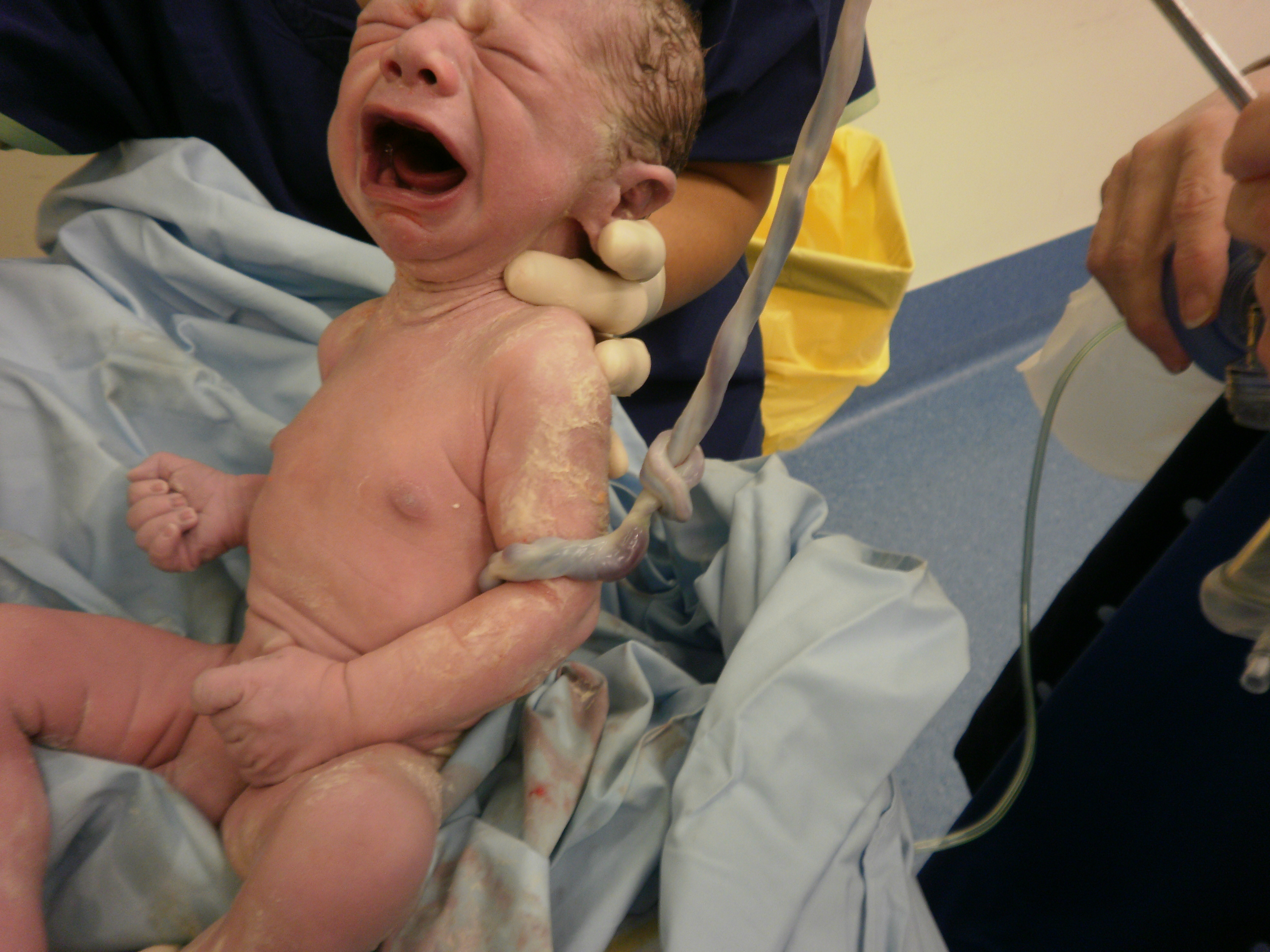
A knotted cord on a newborn baby

A number of abnormalities can affect the umbilical cord, which can cause problems that affect both mother and child:

- Umbilical cord compression can result from, for example, entanglement of the cord, a knot in the cord, or a nuchal cord, (which is the wrapping of the umbilical cord around the fetal neck) but these conditions do not always cause obstruction of fetal circulation.
- Velamentous cord insertion
- Single umbilical artery
- Umbilical cord prolapse
- Vasa praevia

=== Clamping and cutting ===
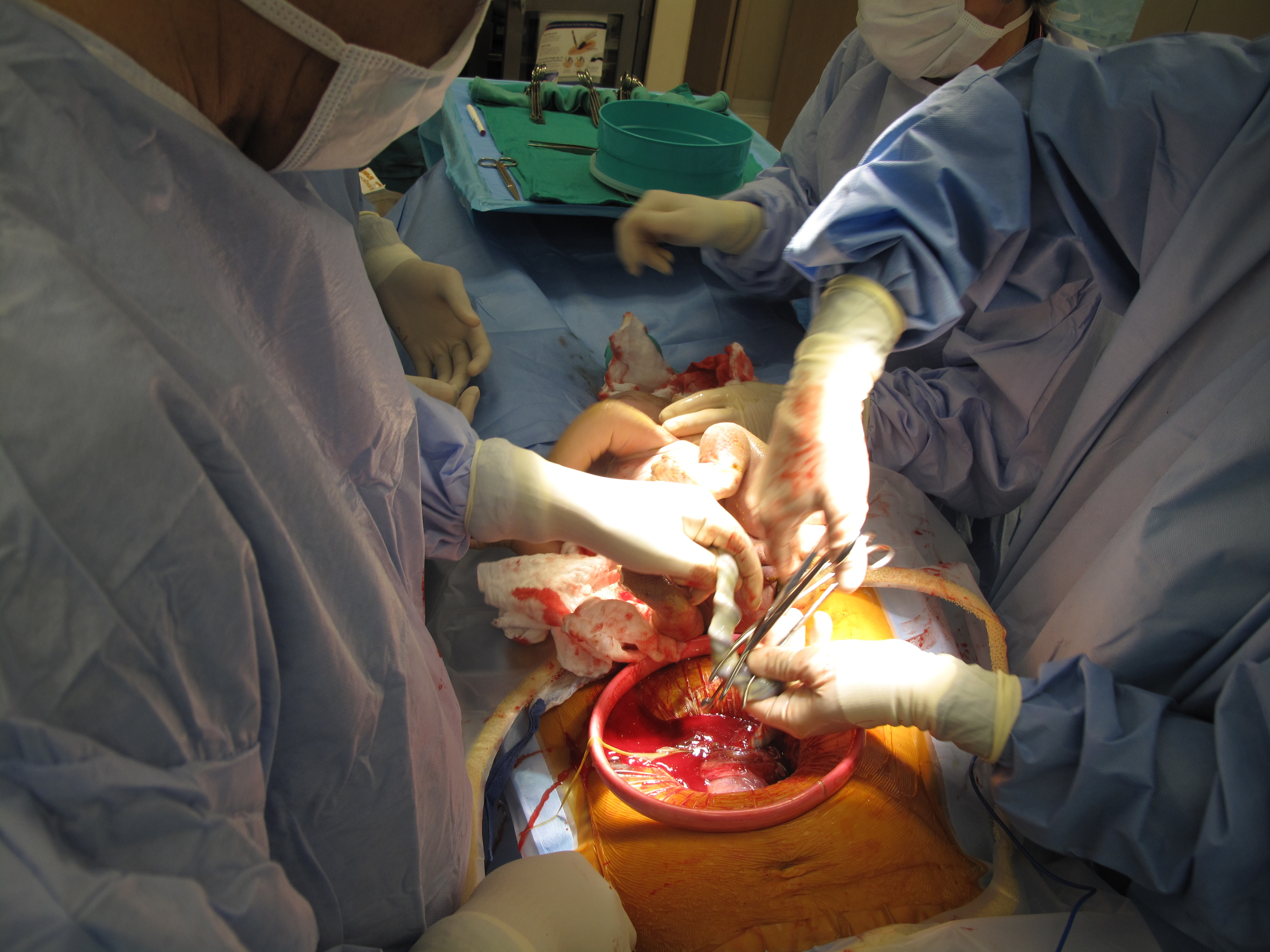
The umbilical cord is about to be cut with scissors via caesarean section

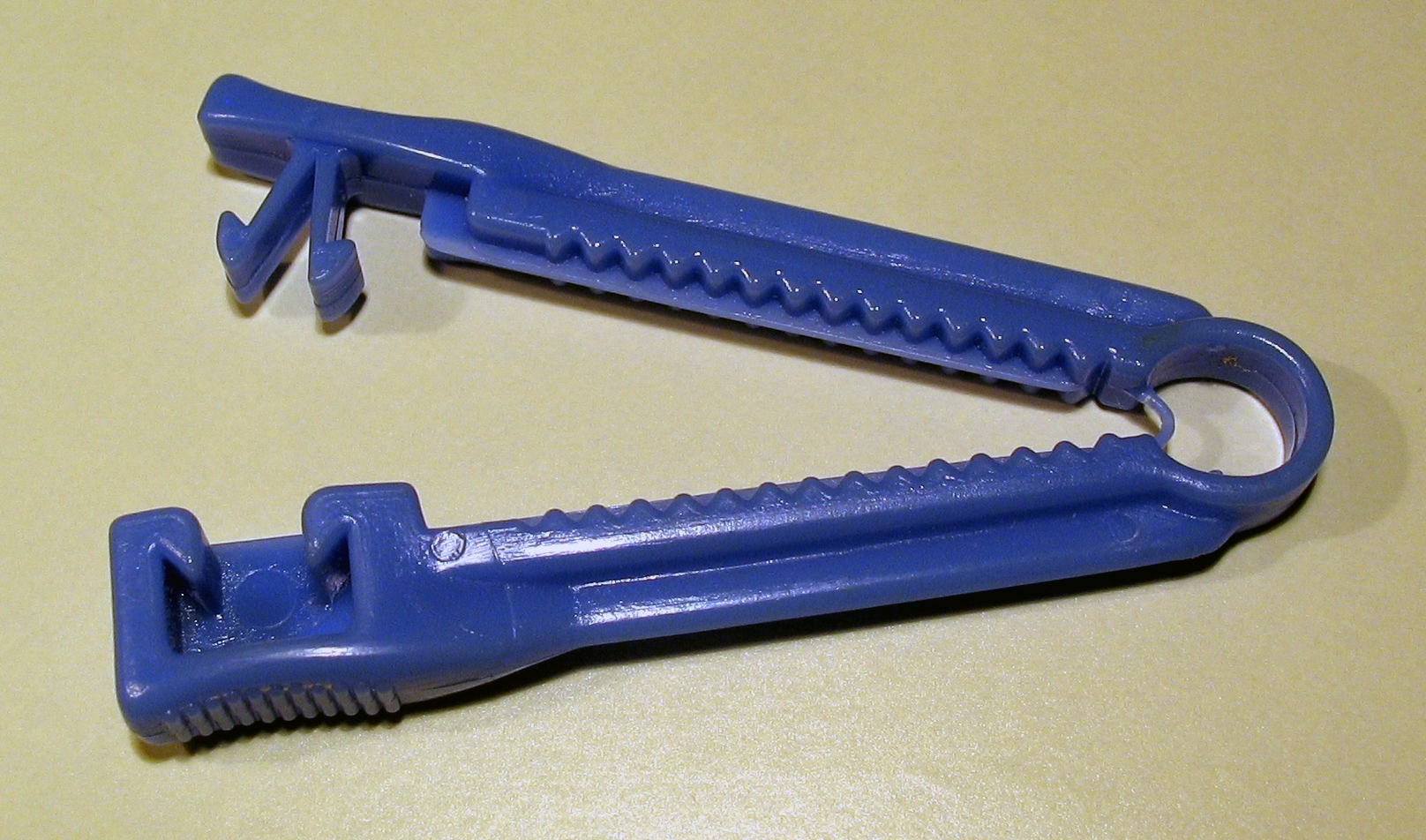
Umbilical cord clamp

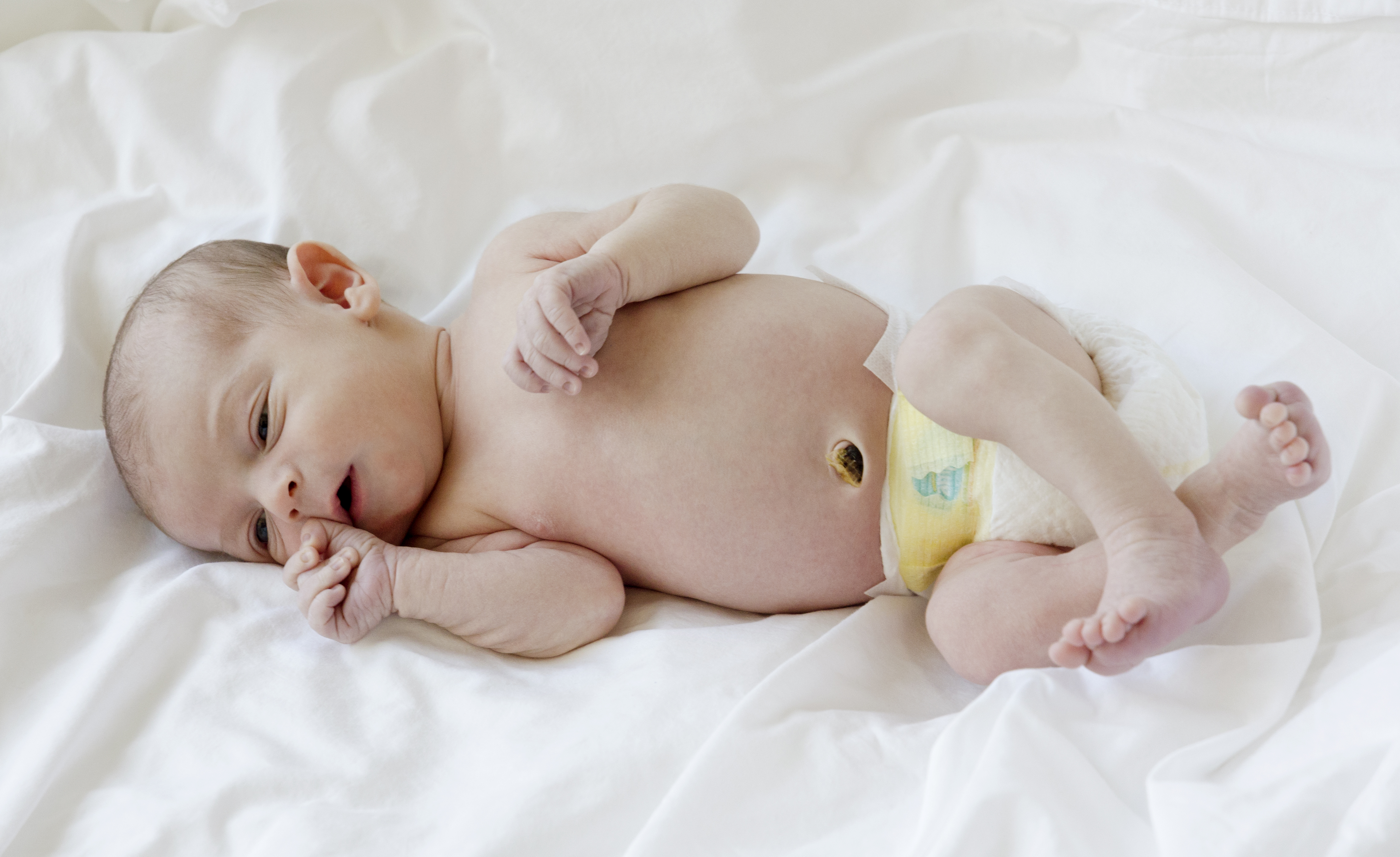
A day-old baby with the cord stump still attached.

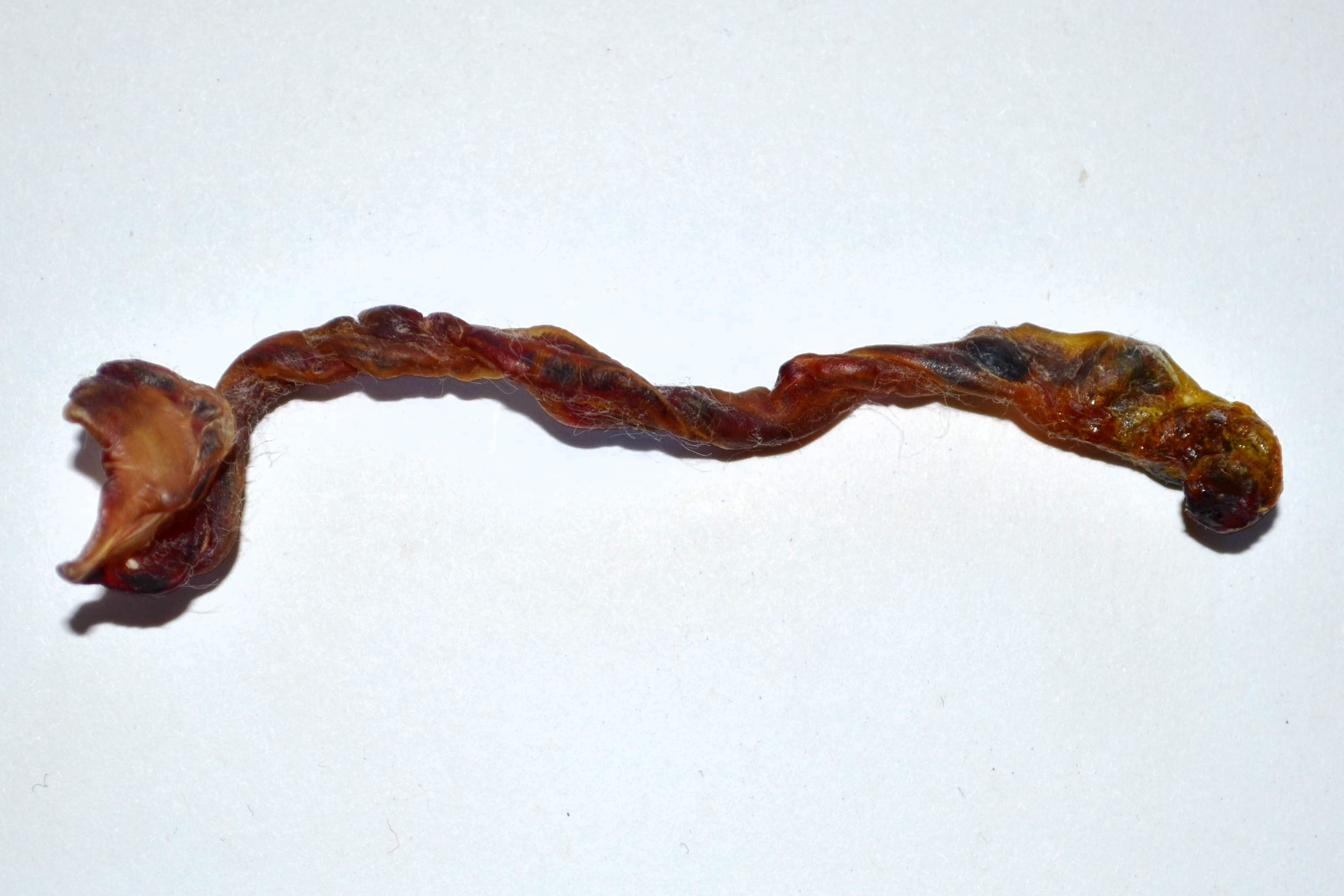
A 7 cm (2.8 in) long detached umbilical cord.

The cord can be clamped at different times; however, delaying the clamping of the umbilical cord until at least one minute after birth improves outcomes as long as there is the ability to treat the small risk of jaundice if it occurs. Clamping is followed by cutting of the cord, which is painless due to the absence of nerves. The cord is extremely tough, like thick sinew, and so cutting it requires a suitably sharp instrument. While umbilical severance may be delayed until after the cord has stopped pulsing (one to three minutes after birth), there is ordinarily no significant loss of either venous or arterial blood while cutting the cord. Current evidence neither supports, nor refutes, delayed cutting of the cord, according to the American Congress of Obstetricians and Gynecologists (ACOG) guidelines.

There are umbilical cord clamps which incorporate a knife. These clamps are safer and faster, allowing one to first apply the cord clamp and then cut the umbilical cord. After the cord is clamped and cut, the newborn wears a plastic clip on the navel area until the compressed region of the cord has dried and sealed sufficiently.

The length of umbilical left attached to the newborn varies by practice; in most hospital settings the length of cord left attached after clamping and cutting is minimal. In the United States, however, where the birth occurred outside of the hospital and an emergency medical technician (EMT) clamps and cuts the cord, a longer segment up to 18 cm (7 in) in length is left attached to the newborn.

The remaining umbilical stub remains for up to ten days as it dries and then falls off.

==== Early versus delayed clamping ====
A Cochrane review in 2013 came to the conclusion that delayed cord clamping (between one and three minutes after birth) is "likely to be beneficial as long as access to treatment for jaundice requiring phototherapy is available". In this review delayed clamping, as contrasted to early, resulted in no difference in risk of severe maternal postpartum hemorrhage or neonatal mortality, and a low Apgar score. On the other hand, delayed clamping resulted in an increased birth weight of on average about 100 g, and an increased hemoglobin concentration of on average 1.5 g/dL with half the risk of being iron deficient at three and six months, but an increased risk of Jaundice requiring phototherapy.

In 2012, the American College of Obstetricians and Gynecologists officially endorsed delaying clamping of the umbilical cord for 30–60 seconds with the newborn held below the level of the placenta in all cases of preterm delivery based largely on evidence that it reduces the risk of intraventricular hemorrhage in these children by 50%. In the same committee statement, ACOG also recognize several other likely benefits for preterm infants, including "improved transitional circulation, better establishment of red blood cell volume, and decreased need for blood transfusion". In January 2017, a revised Committee Opinion extended the recommendation to term infants, citing data that term infants benefit from increased hemoglobin levels in the newborn period and improved iron stores in the first months of life, which may result in improved developmental outcomes. ACOG recognized a small increase in the incidence of jaundice in term infants with delayed cord clamping, and recommended that policies be in place to monitor for and treat neonatal jaundice. ACOG also noted that delayed cord clamping is not associated with increased risk of postpartum hemorrhage.

Several studies have shown benefits of delayed cord clamping: A meta-analysis showed that delaying clamping of the umbilical cord in full-term neonates for a minimum of two minutes following birth is beneficial to the newborn in giving improved hematocrit, iron status as measured by ferritin concentration and stored iron, as well as a reduction in the risk of anemia (relative risk, 0.53; 95% CI, 0.40–0.70). A decrease was also found in a study from 2008. Although there is higher hemoglobin level at 2 months, this effect did not persist beyond 6 months of age. Not clamping the cord for three minutes following the birth of a baby improved outcomes at four years of age. A delay of three minutes or more in umbilical cord clamping after birth reduce the prevalence of anemia in infants.

Negative effects of delayed cord clamping include an increased risk of polycythemia. Still, this condition appeared to be benign in studies. Infants whose cord clamping occurred later than 60 seconds after birth had a higher rate of neonatal jaundice requiring phototherapy.

Delayed clamping is not recommended as a response to cases where the newborn is not breathing well and needs resuscitation. Rather, the recommendation is instead to immediately clamp and cut the cord and perform cardiopulmonary resuscitation. The umbilical cord pulsating is not a guarantee that the baby is receiving enough oxygen.

==== Umbilical nonseverance ====
Some parents choose to omit cord severance entirely, a practice called "lotus birth" or umbilical nonseverance. The entire intact umbilical cord is allowed to dry and separates on its own (typically on the 3rd day after birth), falling off and leaving a healed umbilicus. The Royal College of Obstetricians and Gynaecologists has warned about the risks of infection as the decomposing placenta tissue becomes a nest for infectious bacteria such as Staphylococcus. In one such case, a 20-hour-old baby whose parents chose UCNS was brought to the hospital in an agonal state, was diagnosed with sepsis and required an antibiotic treatment for six weeks.

==== Umbilical cord catheterization ====
As the umbilical vein is directly connected to the central circulation, it can be used as a route for placement of a venous catheter for infusion and medication. The umbilical vein catheter is a reliable alternative to percutaneous peripheral or central venous catheters or intraosseous cannulas and may be employed in resuscitation or intensive care of the newborn.

==== Blood sampling ====
From 24 to 34 weeks of gestation, when the fetus is typically viable, blood can be taken from the cord in order to test for abnormalities (particularly for hereditary conditions). This diagnostic genetic test procedure is known as percutaneous umbilical cord blood sampling.

=== Storage of cord blood ===
The blood within the umbilical cord, known as cord blood, is a rich and readily available source of primitive, undifferentiated stem cells (of type CD34-positive and CD38-negative). These cord blood cells can be used for bone marrow transplant.

Some parents choose to have this blood diverted from the baby's umbilical blood transfer through early cord clamping and cutting, to freeze for long-term storage at a cord blood bank should the child ever require the cord blood stem cells (for example, to replace bone marrow destroyed when treating leukemia). This practice is controversial, with critics asserting that early cord blood withdrawal at the time of birth actually increases the likelihood of childhood disease, due to the high volume of blood taken (an average of 108ml) in relation to the baby's total supply (typically 300ml). The Royal College of Obstetricians and Gynaecologists stated in 2006 that "there is still insufficient evidence to recommend directed commercial cord blood collection and stem-cell storage in low-risk families".

The American Academy of Pediatrics has stated that cord blood banking for self-use should be discouraged (as most conditions requiring the use of stem cells will already exist in the cord blood), while banking for general use should be encouraged. In the future, cord blood-derived embryonic-like stem cells (CBEs) may be banked and matched with other patients, much like blood and transplanted tissues. The use of CBEs could potentially eliminate the ethical difficulties associated with embryonic stem cells (ESCs).

While the American Academy of Pediatrics discourages private banking except in the case of existing medical need, it also says that information about the potential benefits and limitations of cord blood banking and transplantation should be provided so that parents can make an informed decision.

In the United States, cord blood education has been supported by legislators at the federal and state levels. In 2005, the National Academy of Sciences published an Institute of Medicine (IoM) report which recommended that expectant parents be given a balanced perspective on their options for cord blood banking. In response to their constituents, state legislators across the country are introducing legislation intended to help inform physicians and expectant parents on the options for donating, discarding or banking lifesaving newborn stem cells. Currently 17 states, representing two-thirds of U.S. births, have enacted legislation recommended by the IoM guidelines.

The use of cord blood stem cells in treating conditions such as brain injury and Type 1 Diabetes is already being studied in humans, and earlier stage research is being conducted for treatments of stroke, and hearing loss.

Cord blood stored with private banks is typically reserved for use of the donor child only. In contrast, cord blood stored in public banks is accessible to anyone with a closely matching tissue type and demonstrated need. The use of cord blood from public banks is increasing. Currently it is used in place of a bone marrow transplant in the treatment of blood disorders such as leukemia, with donations released for transplant through one registry, Netcord.org, passing 1,000,000 as of January 2013. Cord blood is used when the patient cannot find a matching bone marrow donor; this "extension" of the donor pool has driven the expansion of public banks.

=== Cancer-causing toxicants in human umbilical cords ===
In multiple American and international studies, cancer-causing chemicals have been found in the blood of umbilical cords. These originate from certain plastics, computer circuit boards, fumes and synthetic fragrances among others. Over 300 chemical toxicants have been found, including bisphenol A (BPA), tetrabromobisphenol A (TBBPA), Teflon-related perfluorooctanoic acid, galaxolide and synthetic musks among others. The studies in America showed higher levels in African Americans, Hispanic Americans, and Asian Americans due, it is thought, to living in areas of higher pollution.

== In other animals ==
The umbilical cord in some mammals, including cattle and sheep, contains two distinct umbilical veins. There is only one umbilical vein in the human umbilical cord.

In some animals, the mother will gnaw through the cord, thus separating the placenta from the offspring. The cord, along with the placenta, is often eaten by the mother to provide nourishment and to dispose of tissues that would otherwise attract scavengers or predators. In chimpanzees, the mother leaves the cord in place and nurses her young with the cord and placenta attached until the cord dries out and separates naturally, within a day of birth, at which time the cord is discarded. (This was first documented by zoologists in the wild in 1974.)

Some species of shark—hammerheads, requiems and smooth-hounds—are viviparous and have an umbilical cord attached to their placenta.

== Cultural practices ==
In some traditions, the father of the child cuts the umbilical cord, and he may still be given that opportunity during modern deliveries. In a 2012 study of fathers at a hospital at Portugal, 30% were not asked to cut the cord, 43% cut the cord, and the remaining 27% were asked but declined.

In many cultures the umbilical cord is ceremonially buried at a significant location, often together with the placenta. Aztecs dried the cord before burial, at a battlefield for a boy or at a hearth for a girl. The Comanches hung it on a tree, believing the child would live long if the cord decayed without being disturbed. The Umbilical cord tomb of Taejo of Joseon Dynasty is an archaeological site in Korea, containing the cords of Taejo of Joseon and his son.

In Japan, the umbilical cord is traditionally saved by the mother. It is believed to relate to the child's health and to symbolize their fate. It may be shown on the child's birthday, or given to the child when they leave home.

Mayan midwives use markings on the cord to foretell the child's future.

== Other uses for the term "umbilical cord" ==
The term "umbilical cord" or just "umbilical" has also come to be used for other cords with similar functions, such as the hose connecting surface-supplied divers to their surface supply of air and/or heating, or space-suited astronauts to their spacecraft. Engineers sometimes use the term to describe a complex or critical cable connecting a component, especially when composed of bundles of conductors of different colors, thickness and types, terminating in a single multi-contact disconnect.

== Additional images ==
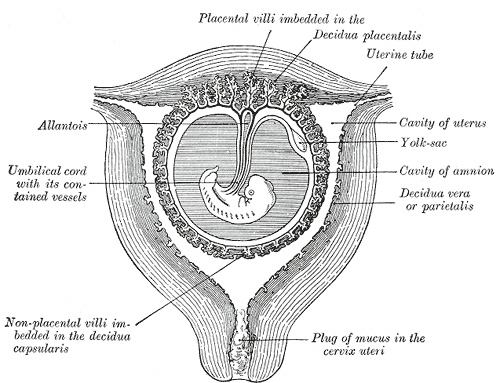
Sectional plan of the gravid uterus in the third and fourth month.

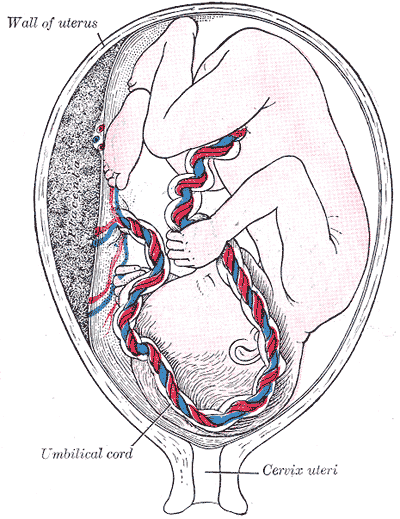
Fetus in utero, between fifth and sixth months.

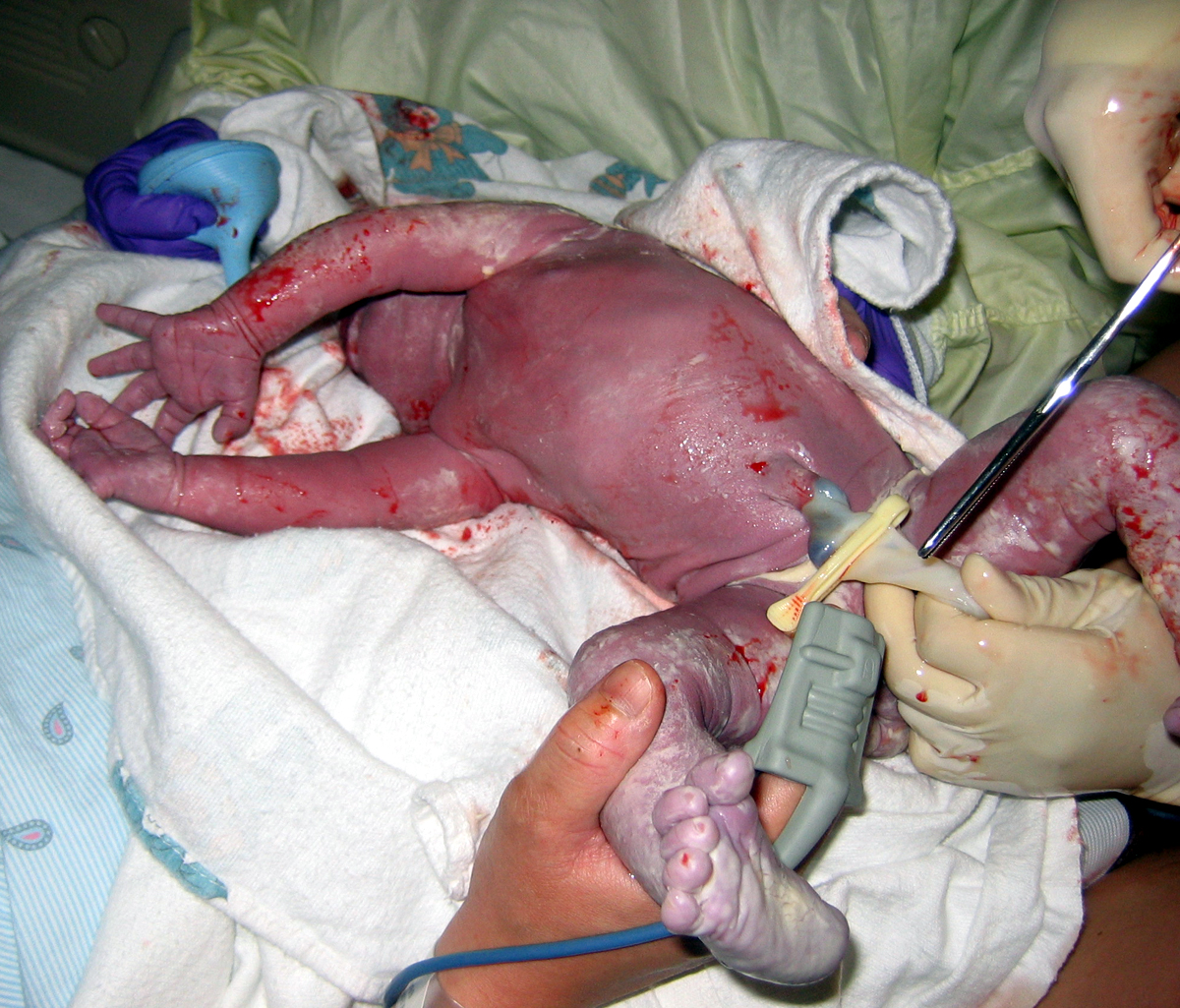
A newborn at 45 seconds, with umbilical cord clamped.

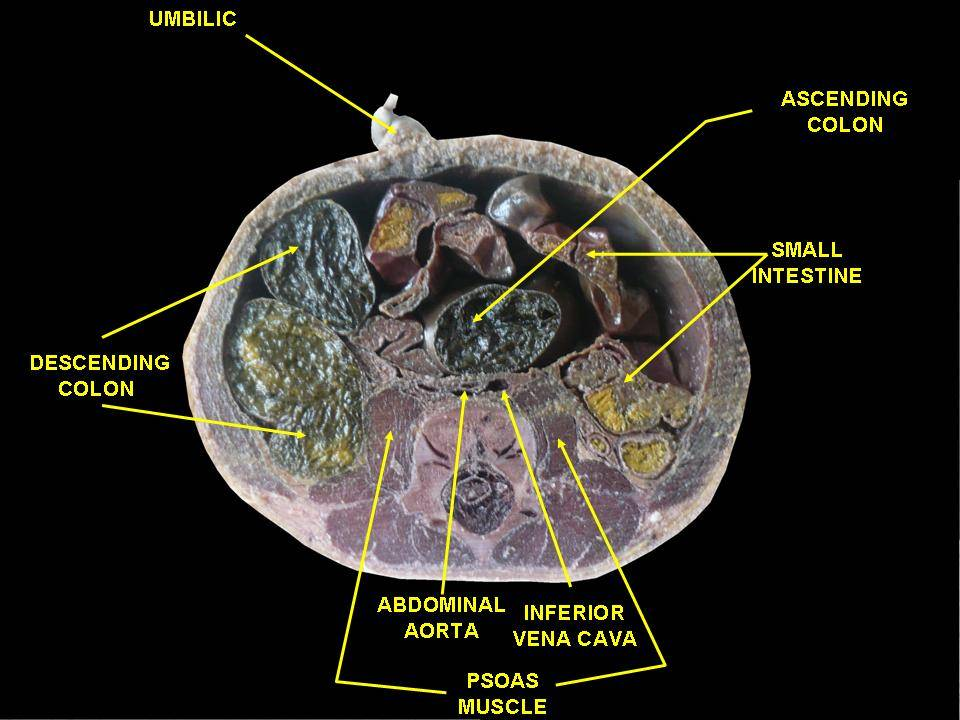
Umbilic. Deep dissection. Serial cross section.

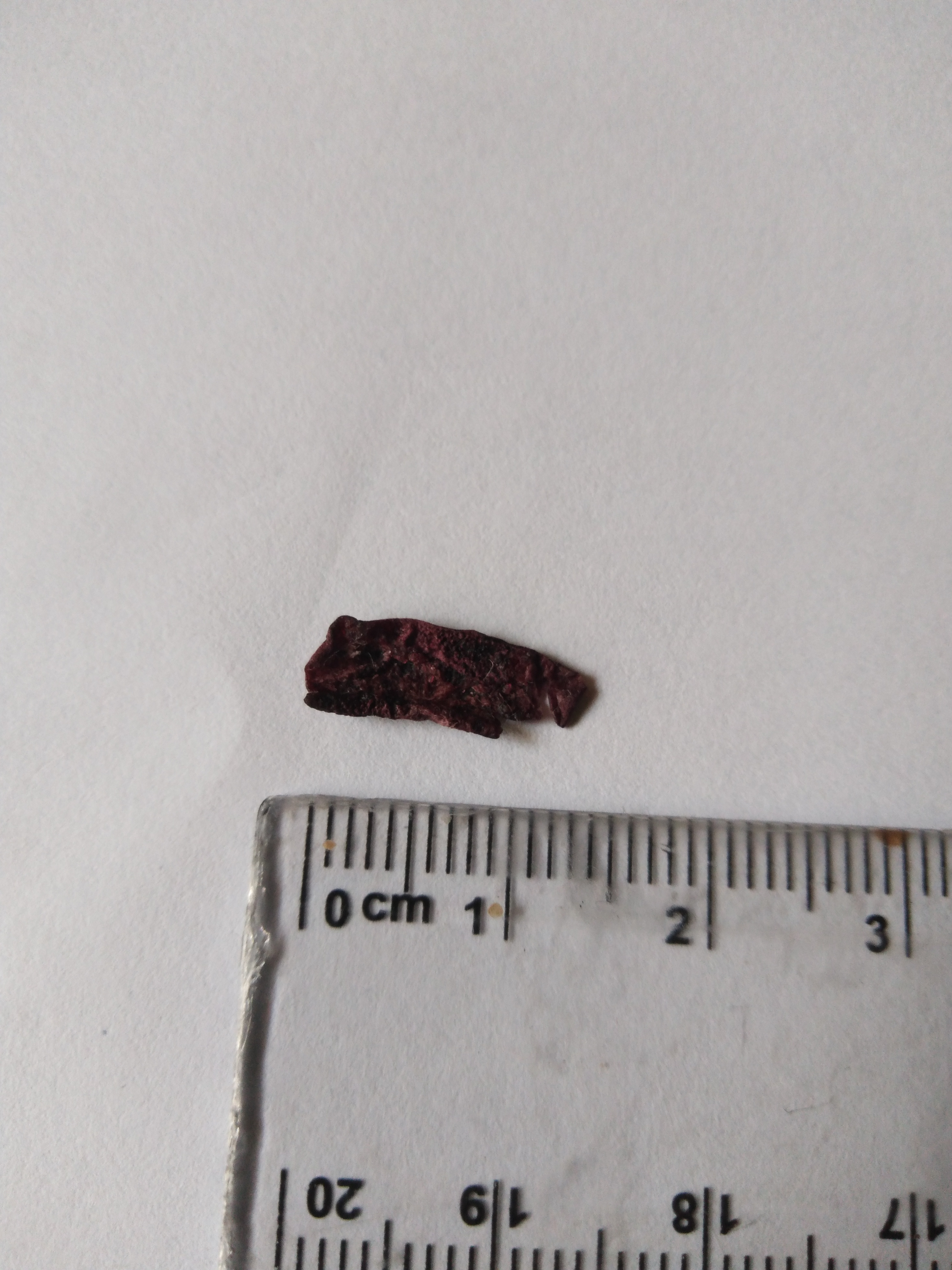
dried umbilical cord stump.

== See also ==
- Umbilical line
