= Postterm pregnancy =

- Other names: Postterm, postmaturity, prolonged pregnancy, post-dates pregnancy, postmature birth
- Specialty: Obstetrics

Postterm pregnancy is a pregnancy continuing past the 42nd week of gestation, two weeks beyond the typical 40-week duration of pregnancy. Postmature births carry risks for both the mother and the baby, including fetal malnutrition, meconium aspiration syndrome, and stillbirths. After the 42nd week of gestation, the placenta, which supplies the baby with nutrients and oxygen from the mother, starts aging and will eventually fail. Postterm pregnancy is a reason to induce labor.

== Definitions ==
The management of labor and delivery may vary depending on the gestational age. It is common to encounter the following terms when describing different time periods of pregnancy.

- Postterm – ≥ 42 weeks + 0 days of gestation (> 293 days from the first day of last menstrual period, or > 13 days from the estimated due date)
- Late term – 41 weeks + 0 days to 41 weeks + 6 days of gestation
- Full term – 39 weeks + 0 days to 40 weeks + 6 days of gestation
- Early term – 37 weeks + 0 days to 38 weeks + 6 days of gestation
- Preterm – ≤ 36 weeks + 6 days of gestation

Besides postterm pregnancy, other terminologies have been used to describe the same condition (≥ 42w+0d), such as prolonged pregnancy, postdates, and postdatism. However, these terminologies are less commonly used to avoid confusion.

Postterm pregnancy should not be confused with postmaturity, postmaturity syndrome, or dysmaturity. These terms describe the neonatal condition that may be caused by postterm pregnancy instead of the duration of pregnancy.

== Signs and symptoms ==
Because postterm pregnancy is a condition solely based on gestational age, there are no confirming physical signs or symptoms. While it is difficult to determine gestational age physically, infants that are born postterm may be associated with a physical condition called postmaturity. The most common symptoms for this condition are dry skin, overgrown nails, creases on the baby's palms and soles of their feet, minimal fat, abundant hair on their head, and either a brown, green, or yellow discoloration of their skin. Doctors diagnose postmature birth based on the baby's physical appearance and the length of the mother's pregnancy. However, some postmature babies may show no or few signs of postmaturity.

=== Baby ===
- Reduced placental perfusion – Once a pregnancy has surpassed the 40-week gestation period, doctors closely monitor the mother for signs of placental deterioration. Toward the end of pregnancy, calcium is deposited on the walls of blood vessels, and proteins are deposited on the surface of the placenta, which changes the placenta. This limits the blood flow through the placenta and ultimately leads to placental insufficiency, and the baby is no longer properly nourished. Induced labor is strongly encouraged if this happens.
- Oligohydramnios – Low volume of amniotic fluid surrounding the fetus. It is associated with complications such as cord compression, abnormal heart rate, fetal acidosis, and meconium amniotic fluid.
- Meconium aspiration syndrome – Respiratory compromise secondary to meconium present in infant's lungs.
- Macrosomia – Excessive birth weight, estimated fetal weight of ≥ 4.5 kg. It can further increase the risk of prolonged labor and shoulder dystocia.
- Shoulder dystocia – Difficulty in delivering the shoulders due to increased body size.
- Increased forceps-assisted or vacuum-assisted birth – When postterm babies are larger than average, forceps or vacuum delivery may be used to resolve the difficulties at the delivery time, such as shoulder dystocia. Complications include lacerations, skin markings, external eye trauma, intracranial injury, facial nerve injury, skull fracture, and rarely death.

=== Mother ===
- Increased labor induction – Induction may be needed if labor progression is abnormal. Oxytocin, a medication used in induction, may have side effects such as low blood pressure.
- Increased forceps assisted or vacuum assisted birth – operative vaginal deliveries increase maternal risks of genital trauma.
- Increased Caesarean birth – Postterm babies may be larger than an average baby, thus increasing the length of labor. The labor is increased because the baby's head is too big to pass through the mother's pelvis. This is called cephalopelvic disproportion. Caesarean sections are encouraged if this happens. Complications include bleeding, infection, abnormal wound healing, abnormal placenta in future pregnancies, and rarely death.

A 2019 randomized control trial of induced labor at 42 or 43 weeks was terminated early due to statistical evidence of "significantly increased risk for women induced at the start of week 43". The study implies clinical guidelines for induction of labor no later than at 41 gestational weeks.

== Causes ==
The causes of post-term births are unknown, but postmature births are more likely when the mother has experienced a previous postmature birth. Due dates are easily miscalculated when the mother is unsure of her last menstrual period. When there is a miscalculation, the baby could be delivered before or after the expected due date. Postmature births can also be attributed to irregular menstrual cycles. When the menstrual period is irregular it is difficult to judge the moment of ovulation and subsequent fertilization and pregnancy. Some postmature pregnancies may not be postmature in reality due to the uncertainty of mother's last menstrual period. However, in most countries where gestation is measured by ultrasound scan technology, this is less likely.

== Monitoring ==
Once a pregnancy is diagnosed postterm, usually at or greater than 42 weeks of gestational age, the mother should be offered additional monitoring as this can provide valuable clues that the fetal health is being maintained.

=== Fetal movement recording ===
Regular movement of the fetus is the best sign indicating that it is still in good health. In the USA, the mother is recommended to keep a "kick-chart" to record the movements of her fetus. If there is a reduction in the number of movements it could indicate placental deterioration.

=== Doppler fetal monitor ===
Doppler fetal monitor is a hand-held device that is routinely used in prenatal care. When it is used correctly, it can quickly measure the fetal heart rate. The baseline of fetal heart rate is typically between 110 and 160 beats per minute.

=== Doppler flow study ===
Doppler flow study is a type of ultrasound that measures the amount of blood flowing in and out of the placenta. The ultrasound machine can also detect the direction of blood flow and display it in red or blue. Usually, a red color indicates a flow toward the ultrasound transducer, while blue indicates a flow away from the transducer. Based on the display, doctors can evaluate blood flow to the umbilical arteries, umbilical veins, or other organs such as heart and brain.

=== Nonstress test ===
Nonstress test (NST) is a type of electronic fetal monitoring that uses a cardiotocograph to monitor fetal heartbeat, fetal movement and mother's contraction. NST is typically monitored for at least 20 minutes. Signs of a reactive (normal) NST include a baseline fetal heart rate (FHR) between 110 and 160 beats per minute (bpm) and 2 accelerations of FHR of at least 15 bpm above baseline for over 15 seconds. Vibroacoustic stimulation and longer monitoring may be needed if NST is non-reactive.

=== Biophysical profile ===
A biophysical profile is a noninvasive procedure that uses the ultrasound to evaluate the fetal health based on NST and four ultrasound parameters: fetal movement, fetal breathing, fetal muscle tone, and the amount of amniotic fluid surrounding the fetus. A score of 2 points is given for each category that meets the criteria or 0 points if the criteria are not met (no 1 point). Sometimes, the NST is omitted, making the highest score 8/8 instead of 10/10. Generally, a score of 8/10 or 10/10 is considered a normal test result, unless 0 points is given for amniotic fluid. A score of 6/10 with normal amniotic fluid is considered equivocal, and a repeated test within 24 hours may be needed. A score of 4/10 or less is considered abnormal, and delivery may be indicated. Low amniotic fluid can cause pinching umbilical cord, decreasing blood flow to the fetus. Therefore, a score of 0 points for amniotic fluid may indicate the fetus is at risk.

== Management ==
=== Expectant ===
A woman who has reached 42 weeks of pregnancy is likely to be offered induction of labour. Alternatively, she can choose expectant management, that is, she waits for the natural onset of labour. Women opting for expectant management may also choose to carry on with additional monitoring of their baby, with regular CTG, ultrasound, and biophysical profile. Risks of expectant management vary between studies.

=== Inducing labor ===
Inducing labor artificially starts the labor process by using medication and other techniques. Labor is usually only induced if there is potential danger to the mother or child. There are several reasons for labor induction; the mother's water breaks, and contractions have not started, the child is postmature, the mother has diabetes or high blood pressure, or there is not enough amniotic fluid around the baby. Labor induction is not always the best choice because it has its own risks. Sometimes mothers will request to be induced for reasons that are not medical. This is called an elective induction. Doctors try to avoid inducing labor unless it is completely necessary.

==== Procedure ====
There are four common methods of starting contractions. The four most common are stripping the membranes, breaking the mother's water, giving the hormone prostaglandin, and giving the synthetic hormone pitocin. Stripping the membranes does not work for all women, but can for most. A doctor inserts a finger into the mother's cervix and moves it around to separate the membrane connecting the amniotic sac, which houses the baby, from the walls of the uterus. Once this membrane is stripped, the hormone prostaglandin is naturally released into the mother's body and initiates contractions. Most of the time doing this only once will not immediately start labor. It may have to be done several times before the stimulant hormone is released, and contractions start. The next method is breaking the mother's water, which is also referred to as an amniotomy. The doctor uses a plastic hook to break the membrane and rupture the amniotic sac. Within a few hours labor usually begins. Giving the hormone prostaglandin ripens the cervix, meaning the cervix softens, thins out, or dilates. The drug Cervidil is administered by mouth in tablet form or in gel form as an insert. This is most often done in the hospital overnight. The hormone oxytocin is usually given in the synthetic form of Pitocin. It is administered through an IV throughout the labor process. This hormone stimulates contractions. Pitocin is also used to "restart" labor when it is lagging.

The use of misoprostol is also allowed, but close monitoring of the mother is required.

==== Perception ====
- Stripping the membranes: Stripping the membranes only takes a few minutes and causes a few intense cramps. Many women report a feeling similar to urination, others report it to be quite painful.
- Breaking the water: Having one's water broken feels like a slight tug and then a warm flow of liquid.
- Pitocin: When the synthetic hormone, pitocin, is used, contractions occur more frequently than a natural occurring birth; they are also more intense.

== Epidemiology ==
Prevalence of postterm pregnancy may vary between countries due to different population characteristics or medical management. Factors include number of first-time pregnancies, genetic predisposition, timing of ultrasound assessment, and Caesarean section rates, etc. The incidence is approximately 7%. Postterm pregnancy occurs in approximately 0.4% of pregnancies in the United States according to birth certificate data.
