= Transient tachypnea of the newborn =

Paediatric and children's diseases

- Other names: Transitory tachypnea of newborn
- Specialty: Pediatrics

Transient tachypnea of the newborn is a respiratory problem that can be seen in the newborn shortly after delivery. It is caused by retained fetal lung fluid due to impaired clearance mechanisms. It is the most common cause of respiratory distress in term neonates. It consists of a period of tachypnea (rapid breathing, higher than the normal range of 30–60 times per minute). Usually, this condition resolves over 24–72 hours. Treatment is supportive and may include supplemental oxygen and antibiotics. The chest x-ray shows hyperinflation of the lungs including prominent pulmonary vascular markings, flattening of the diaphragm, and fluid in the horizontal fissure of the right lung.

== Signs and symptoms ==
Symptoms of transient tachypnea of the newborn include respiratory distress and rapid breathing (tachypnea). This condition usually occurs within the first two hours of birth in full term and late term newborn infants.

== Pathophysiology ==
Due to the higher incidence of transient tachypnea of the newborn in infants delivered by caesarean section, it has been postulated that it could result from a delayed absorption of fetal lung fluid from the pulmonary lymphatic system. The increased fluid in the lungs leads to increased airway resistance and reduced lung compliance. It is thought this could be from lower levels of circulating catecholamines after a caesarean section, which are believed to be necessary to alter the function of the ENaC channel to absorb excess fluid from the lungs. Pulmonary immaturity has also been proposed as a causative factor. Levels of phosphatidylglycerol (an indicator of lung maturity) were found to be negative in certain newborns. Mild deficiency of pulmonary surfactant has also been suggested as a causative factor.

== Diagnosis ==
Transient tachypnea usually occurs in term neonates and has normal to slightly increased lung volumes with perihilar linear densities from fissural fluid, with a characteristic prominent line in the horizontal fissure of the right lung. Pleural effusions can also develop, which are also seen with meconium aspiration but not with respiratory distress syndrome. The lungs may also appear hyperinflated. It is a diagnosis of exclusion as it is a benign condition that can have symptoms and signs similar to more serious syndromes, such as respiratory distress or meconium aspiration.

In distinction to transient tachypnea, respiratory distress syndrome is more common in premature infants. It is characterized by symmetric fine granular opacities, air bronchograms. It does not have pleural effusions because the lung dysfunction is not due to excess fluid (as can occur with a non-compressive Cesaerean section), but decreased surfactant, causing the lungs to be inelastic and crumpled.

Meconium aspiration presents as a neonate with a prolonged delivery and meconium stained amniotic fluid, with decreased lung volumes and ropy perihilar opacities that represent the aspirated meconium on imaging.

== Treatment ==
Supportive care is the treatment of choice for transient tachypnea of the newborn. This may include withholding oral feeding in periods of extreme tachypnea (over 60 breaths per minute) to prevent aspiration, supplemental oxygen, and CPAP. Evidence from clinical trials investigating the use of postnatal corticosteroids for transient tachypnea of the newborn is inconclusive. Similarly, the clinical trial evidence investigating non-invasive respiratory support (i.e. without endotracheal intubation) compared to supplemental oxygen is uncertain. Epinephrine or salbutamol (albuterol) have been suggested as a treatment option for transient tachypnea, as a result of evidence that β-agonists increase the speed of alveolar fluid clearance in the lung of newborns. However, the safety and effectiveness of these treatment approaches is not clear.

== Prognosis ==
Transient tachypnea of the newborn is usually self-limiting. However, it may be associated with wheezing syndromes as the child grows older.

== Epidemiology ==
Transient tachypnea of the newborn occurs in approximately 1 in 100 preterm infants and 3.6–5.7 per 1000 term infants. It is most common in infants born by caesarian section without a trial of labor after 35 weeks of gestation. Male infants and infants with an umbilical cord prolapse or perinatal asphyxia are at higher risk. Parental risk factors include use of pain control or anesthesia during labor, asthma, and diabetes.
