= Contraction stress test =

Medical test on pregnant women

- Purpose: fetal test (heart rate)

A contraction stress test (CST) is performed near the end of pregnancy (34 weeks' gestation) to determine how well the fetus will cope with the contractions of childbirth. The aim is to induce contractions and monitor the fetus to check for heart rate abnormalities using a cardiotocograph. A CST is one type of antenatal fetal surveillance technique.

During uterine contractions, fetal oxygenation is worsened. Late decelerations in fetal heart rate occurring during uterine contractions are associated with increased fetal death rate, growth retardation and neonatal depression. This test assesses fetal heart rate in response to uterine contractions via electronic fetal monitoring. Uterine activity is monitored by tocodynamometer.

== Medical uses ==
The CST is used for its high negative predictive value. A negative result is highly predictive of fetal wellbeing and tolerance of labor. The test has a poor positive predictive value with false-positive results in as many as 30% of cases. A positive CST indicates high risk of fetal death due to hypoxia and is a contraindication to labor. Patient's obstetricians usually consider operative delivery in such situations.

== Contraindications ==
This "stress test" is usually not performed if there are any signs of premature birth, placenta praevia, vasa praevia, cervical incompetence, multiple gestation, previous classic caesarian section. Other contraindications include but are not limited to previous uterine incision with scarring, previous myomectomy entering the uterine cavity, and PROM. Any contraindication to labor is contraindication to CST.

== Procedure ==
CST is performed weekly, as the fetus is assumed to be healthy after a negative test and should remain so for another week. This test is done in hospital or clinic setting. External fetal monitors are put in place and then either nipple stimulation or IV pitocin (oxytocin) is used to stimulate uterine contractions.

=== Nipple stimulation ===
This is a procedure that relies on endogenous release of oxytocin following nipple stimulation, and is conducted by the patient. The nurse instructs the patient on the procedure, as follows. One nipple is massaged gently through clothing until a contraction begins, or for a maximum of 2 minutes. If at least 3 contractions in 10 minutes is not achieved, then the patient rests for 5 minutes and the other nipple is stimulated.

=== Oxytocin challenge test (OCT) ===
If adequate contractions (at least 3 in 10 minutes) cannot be achieved with nipple stimulation, an oxytocin challenge test may be performed. It involves the intravenous administration of exogenous oxytocin to the pregnant woman. The target is to achieve around three contractions every ten minutes.

=== Interpretation ===
Result	Interpretation
Positive	Presence of late decelerations with at least 50% of the contractions
Negative	No late or significant variable decelerations, with at least 3 uterine contractions (lasting 40 seconds) in 10 minute period.
Equivocal—Suspicious	Presence of late decelerations with fewer than 50% of contractions or significant variable decelerations. Requires repeat testing on following day.
Equivocal—Tachysystole	Presence of contractions that occur more frequently than every 2 minutes or last longer than 90 seconds in the presence of late decelerations. Requires repeat testing on following day.
Equivocal—Unsatisfactory	Fewer than three contractions occur within 10 minutes, or a tracing quality that cannot be interpreted. Requires repeat testing on following day.

== History ==
The CST was the first antenatal surveillance test that was developed after the development of the cardiotocograph. The oxytocin challenge test was first described in 1972 and was standardised in 1975 when the parameters of contraction number and frequency were given.

Historically, a CST was done after a non reactive NST. Today, a biophysical profile (BPP) is usually performed.

== See also ==
- Nonstress test
- Cardiotocography
