= Cephalopelvic disproportion =

- Specialty: Obstetrics

Cephalopelvic disproportion (CPD) exists when the capacity of the pelvis is inadequate to allow the fetus to negotiate the birth canal. This may be due to a small pelvis, a nongynecoid pelvic formation, a large fetus, an unfavorable orientation of the fetus, or a combination of these factors. Certain medical conditions may distort pelvic bones, such as rickets or a pelvic fracture, and lead to CPD.

Transverse diagonal measurement has been proposed as a predictive method.

== Signs and symptoms ==
1. Prolonged labor: Labor that does not progress as expected, particularly during the active phase.
2. Failure to progress: Lack of dilation or descent of the baby despite strong contractions.
3. Severe pain: Intense pain that is disproportionate to normal labor pain.
4. Fetal distress: Signs like abnormal heart rate patterns detected via fetal monitoring.
5. Maternal exhaustion: Extreme fatigue in the mother due to prolonged labor.
6. High station: The baby's head remains high in the pelvis and does not descend despite strong contractions.

Diagnosis of CPD usually occurs during labor, often requiring medical interventions such as a cesarean section (C-section) to ensure the safety of both mother and baby.

== Causes ==
A large fetus can be one cause of CPD. A large fetus can be caused by gestational diabetes, postterm pregnancy, genetic factors, and multiparity.

The shape of the pelvis can also be a cause of CPD. The pelvis may be too small, or the shape of the pelvis may be malformed. Shorter women are more likely to have CPD as are adolescents.

== Diagnosis ==
Diagnosis of CPD may be made when there is failure to progress, but not all cases of prolonged labour are the result of CPD. Use of ultrasound to measure the size of the fetus in the womb is controversial, as these methods are often inaccurate and may lead to unnecessary caesarian section; a trial of labour is often recommended even if size of the fetus is estimated to be large.

Theoretically, pelvimetry may identify cephalo-pelvic disproportion. However, a woman's pelvis loosens up before birth (with the help of hormones). A Cochrane review in 2017 found that there was too little evidence to show whether pelvimetry is beneficial and safe when the baby is in cephalic presentation. A review in 2003 came to the conclusion that pelvimetry does not change the management of pregnant women, and recommended that all women should be allowed a trial of labor regardless of pelvimetry results. It considered routine performance of pelvimetry to be a waste of time, a potential liability, and an unnecessary discomfort.

== Treatment ==
In the case of a fetus being too large, some obstetricians recommend induction of labour for earlier delivery. Diagnosis of CPD in active labour will usually result in a Caesarian section.

== See also ==
- Trial of labour
