= Natural induction =

Natural induction can refer to:

- Mathematical induction
- Natural induction (labor)
