= AROM =

AROM or Arom may refer to:

- Active range of motion (AROM), a category of therapeutic exercises related to joint range of motion
- Artificial rupture of membranes (AROM), in childbirth
- Simha Arom (born 1930), a French-Israeli ethnomusicologist

== See also ==
- Sawang Arom District, Thailand
