= Amniotic fluid index =

Measurement used in fetal well-being

- Purpose: estimate of amniotic fluid and an indicator of fetal well-being

Amniotic fluid index (AFI) is a quantitative estimate of amniotic fluid and an indicator of fetal well-being. It is a separate measurement from the biophysical profile.

AFI is the score (expressed in centimetres) given to the amount of amniotic fluid seen on ultrasonography of a pregnant uterus. To determine the AFI, doctors may use a four-quadrant technique, when the deepest, unobstructed, vertical length of each pocket of fluid is measured in each quadrant and then added up to the others, or the so-called "single deepest pocket" technique.

An AFI between 8 and 18 cm is considered normal. Median AFI level is approximately 14 cm from week 20 to week 35, when the amniotic fluid begins to reduce in preparation for birth. An AFI smaller than 5–6 cm is considered as oligohydramnios. The exact number can vary by gestational age. The fifth percentile for gestational age is sometimes used as a cutoff value. An AFI larger than 24–25 cm is considered as polyhydramnios.

== Causes of low amniotic fluid ==
There are many things that can cause low AFI, these include:

- Leaking or rupture of membranes: Leaking or rupture of membranes may be caused by a gush of fluid or a slow constant trickle of fluid. This is due to a tear in the membrane. Premature rupture of membranes can also result in low amniotic fluid levels.
- Placental problems: Placental problems may cause low amniotic fluid. If the placenta is not providing enough blood and nutrients to the baby, then the baby may stop recycling fluid.
- Birth defects: Birth defects may occur if the fetus has problems with the development of the kidneys or urinary tract, which could cause little urine production, and it can lead to low levels of amniotic fluid.
- Maternal complications: Maternal complications may cause low amniotic fluid. Some factors such as hypertension, diabetes, dehydration, preeclampsia, and chronic hypoxia in a woman can have an effect on amniotic fluid levels.
