= Polyhydramnios =

Excess of amniotic fluid in the amniotic sac

- Other names: Polyhydramnion, hydramnios, polyhydramnios
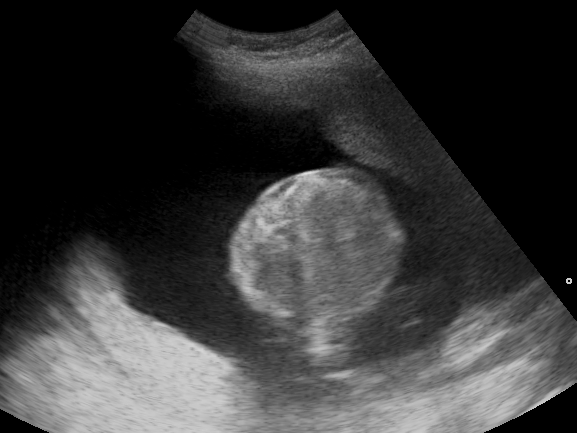
- Specialty: Obstetrics

Polyhydramnios is a medical condition describing an excess of amniotic fluid in the amniotic sac. It is seen in about 1% of pregnancies. It is typically diagnosed when the amniotic fluid index (AFI) is greater than 24 cm. There are two clinical varieties of polyhydramnios: chronic polyhydramnios where excess amniotic fluid accumulates gradually, and acute polyhydramnios where excess amniotic fluid collects rapidly.

The opposite to polyhydramnios is oligohydramnios, not enough amniotic fluid.

== Presentation ==
=== Associated conditions ===
Fetuses with polyhydramnios are at risk for a number of other problems including cord prolapse, placental abruption, premature birth and perinatal death. At delivery the baby should be checked for congenital abnormalities.

== Causes ==
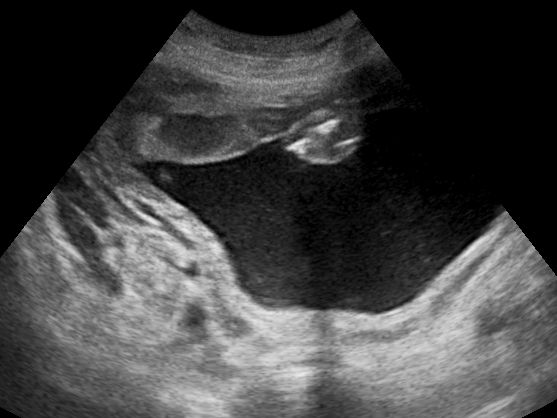

In most cases, the exact cause cannot be identified. Amniotic fluid is created from fetal urine, and is decreased by fetal swallowing and absorption in their gut. Anything which increases fetal urine production, or impairs fetal swallowing or absorption, contributes to the build up of excessive amniotic fluid. Therefore, a single case can have one or more causes, including intrauterine infection (TORCH), rh-isoimmunisation, or chorioangioma of the placenta. In a multiple gestation pregnancy, the cause of polyhydramnios usually is twin-to-twin transfusion syndrome. Maternal causes include cardiac problems, kidney problems, and maternal diabetes mellitus, which causes fetal hyperglycemia and resulting polyuria (fetal urine is a major source of amniotic fluid).

A recent study distinguishes between mild and severe polyhydramnios and showed that Apgar score of less than 7, perinatal death and structural malformations only occurred in women with severe polyhydramnios. In another study, all patients with polyhydramnios, that had a sonographically normal fetus, showed no chromosomal anomalies.

These anomalies include:

- Gastrointestinal abnormalities such as esophageal atresia and duodenal atresia (causing inability to swallow amniotic fluid), anencephaly, facial cleft, neck masses, tracheoesophageal fistula, and diaphragmatic hernias. An annular pancreas causing obstruction may also be the cause.
- Bochdalek's hernia, in which the pleuro-peritoneal membranes (especially the left) will fail to develop and seal the pericardio-peritoneal canals. This results in the stomach protrusion up into the thoracic cavity, and the fetus is unable to swallow sufficient amounts of amniotic fluid.
- Fetal renal disorders that result in increased urine production during pregnancy, such as in antenatal Bartter syndrome. Molecular diagnosis is available for these conditions.
- Neurological abnormalities such as anencephaly, which impair the swallowing reflex. Anencephaly is failure of closure of the rostral neuropore (rostral neural tube defect). If the rostral neuropore fails to close there will be no neural mechanism for swallowing.
- Chromosomal abnormalities such as Down syndrome and Edwards syndrome, which is itself often associated with gastrointestinal abnormalities.
- Skeletal dysplasia, or dwarfism. There is a possibility of the chest cavity not being large enough to house all of the baby's organs causing the trachea and esophagus to be restricted, not allowing the baby to swallow the appropriate amount of amniotic fluid.
- Sacrococcygeal teratoma

== Diagnosis ==
There are several pathologic conditions that can predispose a pregnancy to polyhydramnios. These include a maternal history of diabetes mellitus, Rh incompatibility between the fetus and mother, intrauterine infection, and multiple pregnancies.

During the pregnancy, certain clinical signs may suggest polyhydramnios. In the mother, the physician may observe increased abdominal size out of proportion for her weight gain and gestation age, uterine size that outpaces gestational age, shiny skin with stria (seen mostly in severe polyhydramnios), dyspnea, and chest heaviness. When examining the fetus, faint fetal heart sounds are also an important clinical sign of this condition.

== Treatment ==
Mild asymptomatic polyhydramnios is managed expectantly. A woman with symptomatic polyhydramnios may need hospital admission. Antacids may be prescribed to relieve heartburn and nausea. No data support dietary restriction of salt and fluid. In some cases, amnioreduction, also known as therapeutic amniocentesis, has been used in response to polyhydramnios.

== See also ==
- Amniotic fluid index
