= Biophysical profile =

Prenatal ultrasound evaluation of fetal well-being

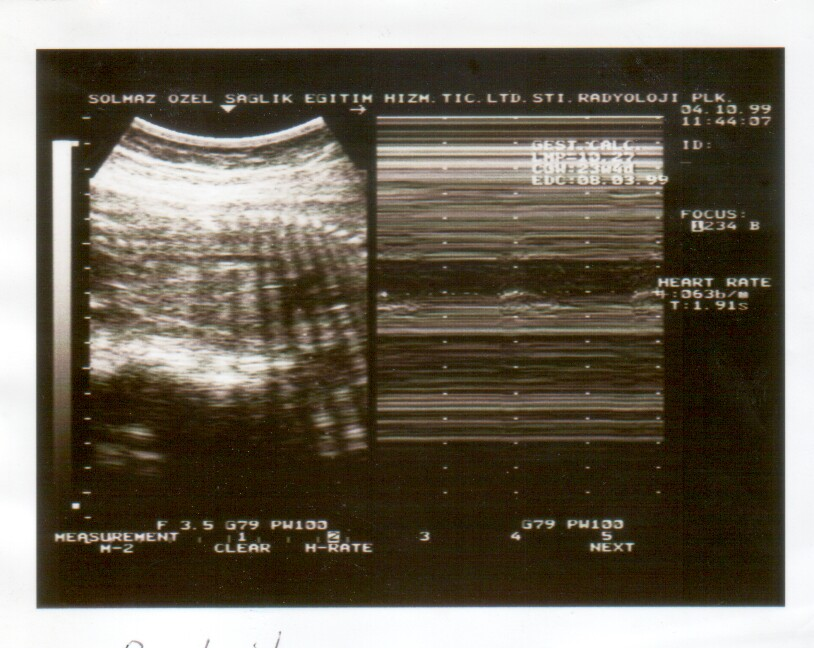
- Synonyms: BPP
- Purpose: prenatal evaluation ultrasound

A biophysical profile (BPP) is a prenatal ultrasound evaluation of fetal well-being involving a scoring system, with the score being termed Manning's score. It is often done when a non-stress test (NST) is non reactive, or for other obstetrical indications.

The "modified biophysical profile" consists of the NST and amniotic fluid index only.

== Procedure ==
The BPP has five components: four ultrasound (US) assessments and an NST. The NST evaluates fetal heart rate and response to fetal movement. The five discrete biophysical variables are:

1. Fetal heart rate
2. Fetal breathing
3. Fetal movement
4. Fetal tone
5. Amniotic fluid volume

| Parameter | Normal (2 points) | Abnormal (0 points) |
|---|---|---|
| NST/Reactive FHR | At least two accelerations in 20 minutes | Less than two accelerations to satisfy the test in 20 minutes |
| US: Fetal breathing movements | At least one episode of > 30s or >20s in 30 minutes | None or less than 30s or 20s |
| US: Fetal activity / gross body movements | At least three discrete body/limb movement in 30 minutes (episodes of active continuous movement considered a single movement. | Less than three or two movements |
| US: Fetal muscle tone | At least one episode of active extension with return to flexion of fetal limb(s) or trunk, opening and closing of hand considered to be normal tone. | Either slow extension with return to partial flexion or movement of limb in full extension or absent fetal movement. |
| US: Qualitative AFV/AFI | At least one vertical pocket > 2 cm in the vertical axis or AFI of 5 cm | Largest vertical pocket </= 2 cm, or AFI </= 5 cm |

Use of vibroacoustic stimulation to accelerate evaluation has been described.

== Interpretation ==
Each assessment is graded either 0 or 2 points and then added up to yield a number between 0 and 10. A BPP of 8 or 10 is generally considered reassuring. A BPP normally is not performed before the second half of a pregnancy since fetal movements do not occur in the first half. The presence of these biophysical variables implies absence of significant central nervous system hypoxemia/acidemia at the time of testing. By comparison, a compromised fetus typically exhibits loss of accelerations of the fetal heart rate (FHR), decreased body movement and breathing, hypotonia, and, less acutely, decreased amniotic fluid volume.

Recommended management based on the biophysical profile
| BPP | Recommended management |
|---|---|
| ≤2 | Labor induction |
| 4 | Labor induction if gestational age >32 weeks; Repeating test same day if <32 weeks, then delivery if BPP <6 |
| 6 | Labor induction if >36 weeks if favorable cervix and normal AFI; Repeating test in 24 hours if <36 weeks and cervix unfavorable; then delivery if BPP <6, and follow-up if >6 |
| ≥ 8 | Labor induction if presence of oligohydramnios |

== See also ==
- Nonstress test
- Cardiotocography
