= Post-maturity syndrome =

Medical condition of infants born post-term

- Symptoms: Oligohydramnios; meconium aspiration; macrosomia
- Usual onset: Infancy
- Causes: Post-term birth
- Risk factors: Previous post-term births; old mother; obese mother; family history

Post-maturity syndrome is the condition of a baby born after a post-term pregnancy, first described by Stewart H. Clifford in 1954. Post-maturity refers to any baby born after 42 weeks gestation, or 294 days past the first day of the mother's last menstrual period. Less than 6 percent of all babies are born after this time. The syndrome develops in about 20% of human pregnancies continuing past the expected delivery date.

Features of post-maturity syndrome include oligohydramnios (a deficiency of amniotic fluid); meconium aspiration (breathing meconium in the amniotic fluid); and macrosomia (being overly large). The syndrome also causes fetal problems like dry peeling skin, overgrown nails, abundant scalp hair, visible creases on palms and soles, absence of vernix caseosa, loss of subcutaneous fat, and green or yellow skin colour due to meconium staining.

== Definition ==
Post-maturity refers to any baby born after 42 weeks gestation or 294 days past the first day of the mother's last menstrual period. Although pregnancy is said to last nine months, health care providers track pregnancy by weeks and days. The estimated delivery date, also called the estimated due date or EDD, is calculated as 40 weeks or 280 days from the first day of the last menstrual period. Only 4 percent (1 in 20) women will deliver on their due date. The terms Post-maturity or "Post-term" are both words used to describe babies born after 42 weeks. The terms "post-maturity" and "post-term" are interchangeable. As there are many definitions for prolonged pregnancy the incidence varies from 2 to 10%. When incidence is taken as delivery beyond 42 weeks it is 10%, if it is taken according to the delivered baby's weight and length it is 2%.

== Macrosomia ==
In most cases, continued fetal growth between 39- and 43-week gestation results in an macrosomic, or overly large infant. However, sometimes the placenta involutes, and multiple infarcts and villous degeneration cause placental insufficiency syndrome. In this syndrome, the fetus receives inadequate nutrients and oxygen from the mother, resulting in a thin (due to soft-tissue wasting), small-for-gestational-age, undernourished infant with depleted glycogen stores. The baby may have a birth weight of 4 kilograms (8.8 lb) and length of 54 centimetres (21 in) but these findings are variable, even if the baby was underweight.

== Risk factors ==
Post-maturity is more likely to happen when a mother has had a post-term pregnancy before. After one post-term pregnancy, the risk of a second post-term birth increases by 2 to 3 times. Other, minor risk factors include an older or obese mother, a white mother, male baby, or a family history of post-maturity. Maternal risks include obstructed labor, perineal damage, instrumental vaginal delivery, a Cesarean section, infection, and postpartum hemorrhage. Accurate pregnancy due dates can help identify babies at risk for post-maturity. Ultrasound examinations early in pregnancy help establish more accurate dating by measurements taken of the fetus. Pregnancies complicated by gestational diabetes, hypertension, or other high-risk conditions should be managed according to guidelines for those conditions.
