= Knee-chest position =

Position used in a number of medical situations

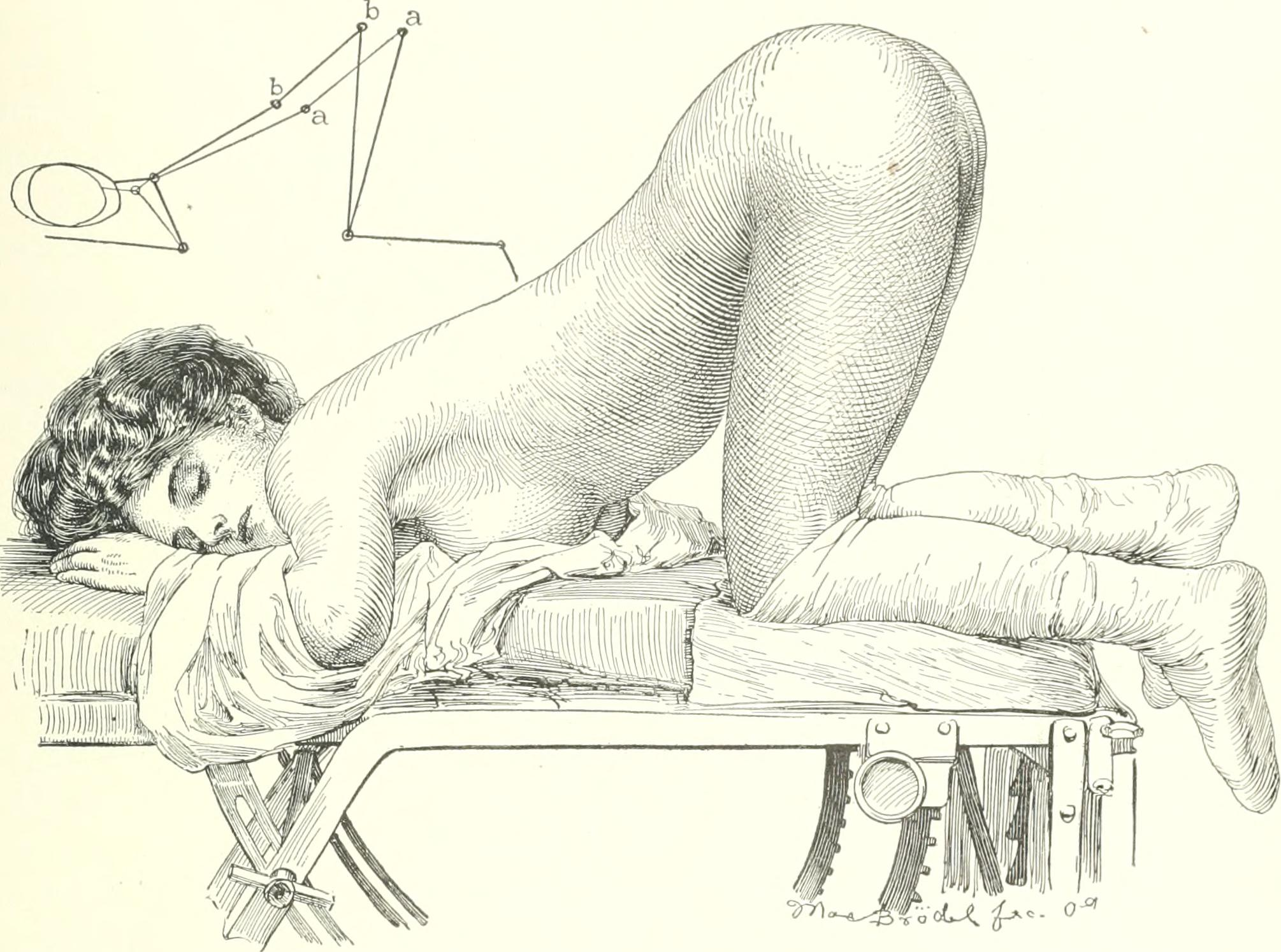
The knee-chest position

The knee-chest position or genupectoral position is a position used in a number of medical situations including gynecological examination and surgery, lumbar spine surgery, repair of vesico-vaginal fistula (VVF) by Sims's saucerisation procedure, labor and delivery for which it is recommended in those with a cord prolapse until delivery can occur, and administering enemas.
