= Extra-amniotic administration =

Route of drug administration

Extra-amniotic administration is a route of administration to the space between the fetal membranes and endometrium inside the uterus of a pregnant woman.

It can be used to administer drugs affecting uterus motility, such as oxytocin and prostaglandins, e.g. in labor induction or medical abortion.
