= Supratarsal injection =

Medical procedure

Schematic diagram of the human eye.

Supratarsal injection is an ocular route of drug administration. It is used to administer a medication to the tarsus of the eyelid.

Supratarsal injection of corticosteroids, such as hydrocortisone, triamcinolone acetonide and dexamethasone, is indicated in the treatment of refractory or recalcitrant vernal keratoconjunctivitis (VKC) cases are often resistant to conventional treatments.

It is also studied in the treatment of allergic conjunctivitis.
