= Uterine niche =

Medical disorder of the uterus

Uterine Niche
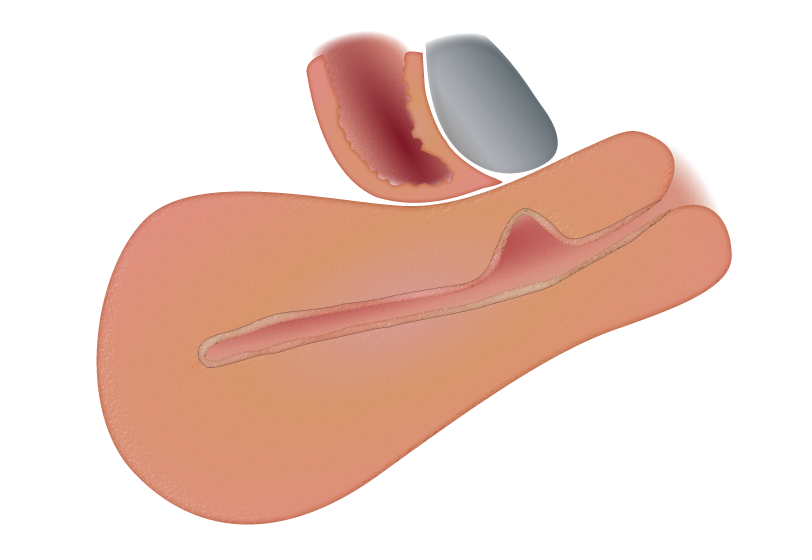
- the uterine niche
- Specialty: Gynaecology
- Frequency: 60-70% of women after a cesarean section, 100% after 3rd cesarean section

A uterine niche, also known as a Cesarean scar defect or an isthmocele, is an indentation of the myometrium at the site of a cesarean section with a depth of at least 2 mm.

== History ==
A niche, also known as a Cesarean Scar Defect or an Isthmocele, is a defect in the wall of the uterus after a cesarean section. You can imagine it as if the wound of the uterus is being closed after a cesarean section, but it's receding a little bit at the inside of the uterus. Studies have shown that if you would do a trans-vaginal ultrasound in all women after a cesarean section, you can see a niche in 60 to 70 percent of all women. A niche can be called big when it's more than half of the wall of the uterus or when the wall of the uterus above the niche is less than 3 millimeters.

== Causes ==
It's not really known why some women get a niche and others don't. Although many studies have been done, there are no studies that give a definite answer to the question why some women get a niche. One study has a few theories about the cause of a niche. One of the reasons can be the presence of adenomyosis which might cause improper healing. Adenomyosis is a disorder where the endometrium, the inside lining of the uterus, grows between the muscle cells of the wall of the uterus. Another reason can be that it's an individual suboptimal healing process. Studies have also shown that a lot of women have severe adhesions between the niche and the bladder. Adhesions are connective tissue caused by surgery in this case because of the cesarean section. The theory would be that the adhesions pull on the wall of the uterus causing it to be lifted upwards a little bit therefore causing a niche. All these things are just hypothesis. One study has shown though that closing the wound of the cesarean section in one layer or in two layer does not really make a difference. However another study notes that uterine incision closure techniques that excludes of the endometrium at uterine closure reduces the development of significant scar defects and niche.

== Cesarean Scar Disorder ==
Although studies are increasing, an international debate can be about their relevance. If 60 to 70% of women after cesarean section actually get a niche, maybe it's not that relevant because not all these people have symptoms, or perhaps not all the affected people report the symptoms nor it is recognised as the problem is not known to many primary-care physicians. Therefore, in 2023, a paper discussed the cesarean scar disorder. This is a combination of having a niche on ultrasound with a minimum amount of symptoms that the woman has. Apart from having a niche and symptoms, it's also important to exclude other causes of the symptoms other than the niche. The Cesarean Scar Disorder paper defined primary and secondary symptoms. The primary symptoms are those that are directly caused because of the defect in the wall of the uterus. These are postmentrual spotting, pain during menstrual bleeding, technical difficulty inserting the catheter during embryo transfer and secondary unexplained infertility combined with intrauterine fluid (fluid inside of the uterine cavity after the ovulation). Secondary symptoms are symptoms that are caused usually because of the primary symptoms. These are dyspareunia (pain during sex), abnormal vaginal discharge, chronic pelvic pain, avoiding sexual intercourse, door associated with abnormal blood loss, secondary unexplained infertility or secondary infertility despite Assisted Reproductive Treatment (for example IVF), a negative self-image or discomfort during participation in leisure activities. Because there are other reasons that women can have these symptoms, these other causes should be excluded. Things are, for example, cervical dysplasia, vaginal/uterine infection, uterine pathology like polyps and fibroids, etc. When woman has a niche, symptoms started after the cesarean section and there is not other good explanation for the symptoms, she has a cesarean scar disorder. Having a cesarean scar disorder does not mean it needs treatment, but it might be an important diagnosis.

== Treatments ==
To treat a cesarean scar disorder is mainly dependent on the amount of symptoms and whether or not a woman still wants to get pregnant. Please always consult with your own doctor if you think you have a cesarean scar disorder and if you think that it needs treatment. A niche can be treated on multiple ways. You have to keep in mind that usually asymptomatic woman should not be treated at all, especially not improve obstetrics outcomes. The way to treat a cesarean scar disorder depends on the wish to conceive. If there is no wish to conceive, hormonal therapy can be very effective, for example using a hormonal IUD. In case of failure or contra-indications to medical treatment, surgery can be considered. Also in women who are trying to get pregnant, medical treatment might not suffice. A hystroscopic niche resection can be considered when a niche is small is more of a resection than repair. When a niche is big, it can be considered to perform a laproscopic or a vaginal niche resection in which the niche is removed and the defect is sutured back together. The indications and the effect of these therapies are still on the research.

== Being pregnant with a niche ==
Debate is ongoing about whether or not it is dangerous to become pregnant again with a large niche. Although studies are limited, there is very little evidence that being pregnant with a niche is dangerous. The main problem is that it's not known how many women have a niche and got pregnant with it without ever seeing a doctor. If indeed 60-70% of all women in the world get a niche after a cesarean section, many women don't know they have a niche, got pregnant and never experienced any trouble during pregnancy. The worst-case scenario of having a niche is the chance of a uterine rupture. A uterine rupture means that the wall of the uterus, at the place of the previous cesarean section or at the place of the niche, opens up, therefore can cause stress to the baby. Having a spontaneous uterine rupture, in other words a uterine rupture without contractions is extremely rare. Having a uterine rupture during active labor in women who had a cesarean section before is still relatively rare. We call this a vaginal birth after cesarean, a VBAC. VBAC complications are definitely well described, but the relationship between a niche and VBAC complications are not known yet. Therefore, patients with a niche may to discuss with doctors trial of labor and the method of birth.
