= Prolonged labor =

- Other names: Failure to progress
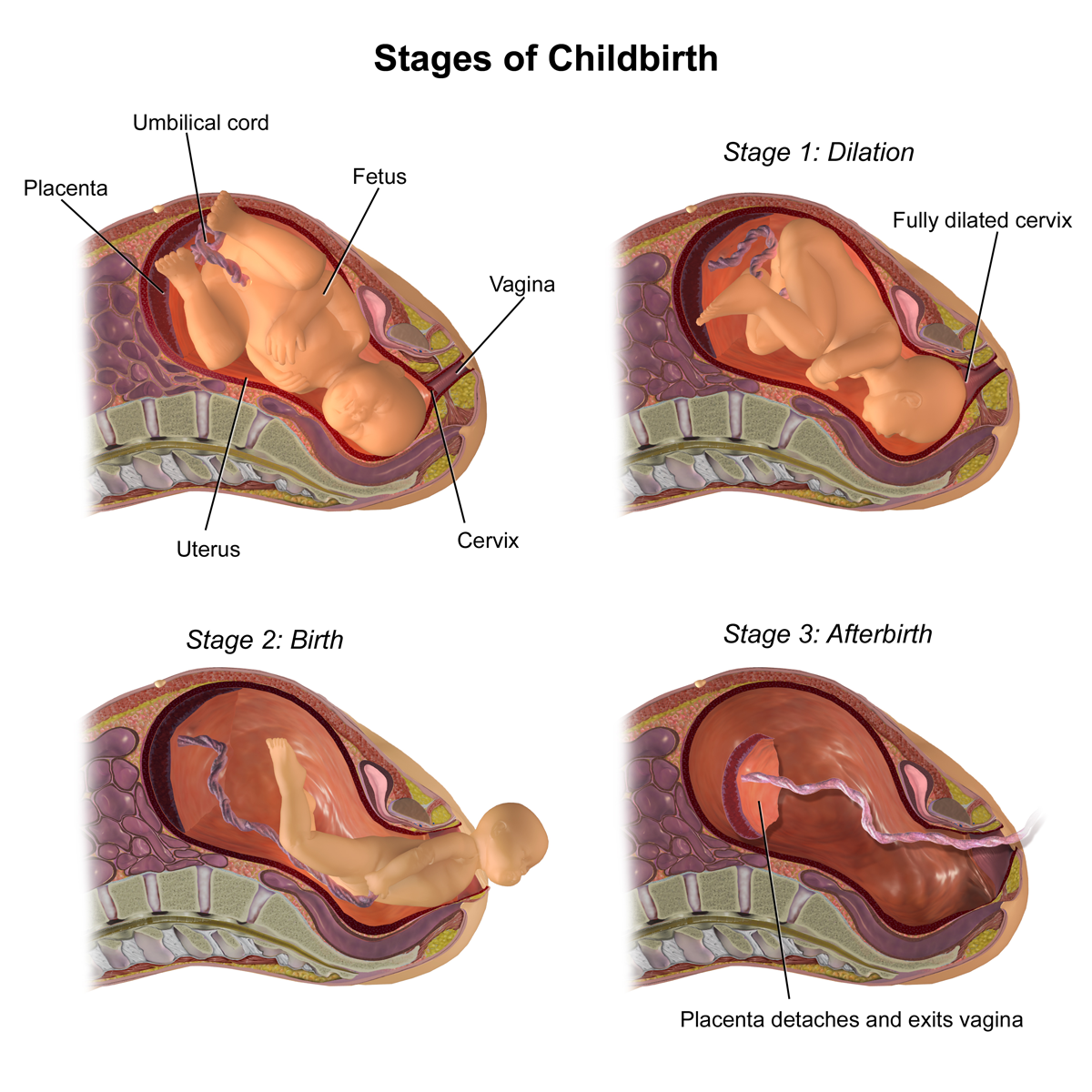
- Normal stages of childbirth

Prolonged labor is the inability of a woman to proceed with childbirth upon going into labor. Prolonged labor typically lasts over 20 hours for first time mothers, and over 14 hours for women who have already had children. Failure to progress can take place during two different phases; the latent phase and active phase of labor. The latent phase of labor can be emotionally tiring and cause fatigue, but it typically does not result in further problems. The active phase of labor, on the other hand, if prolonged, can result in long term complications.

It is important that the vital signs of the woman and fetus are being monitored so preventive measures can be taken if prolonged labor begins. Women experiencing prolonged labor should be under supervision of a surgically equipped doctor. Prolonged labor is determined based on the information that is being collected regarding the strength and time between contractions. Medical teams track this data using intrauterine pressure catheter placement (IUPC) and continuous electronic fetal monitoring (EFM). IUPC is a straw that is inserted into the womb with a monitor that reads when contractions are coming and how strong they are. EFMs are used to track the fetal heart rate. If either devices indicate that vital signs are off and prolonged labor is beginning, it is important that the medical team begin discussing treatment and alternative options for delivery.

Prolonged labor can result from a variety of different issues, such as fetal malpresentation, issues with uterine contractions, cervical dystocia or stenosis, and cephalopelvic disproportion. Both fetal malpresentation and cervical dystocia may result in obstructed labor. The cause of prolonged labor will determine the medical intervention that needs to take place. Medical professionals can either engage in preventive measures or turn to surgical methods of removing the fetus. If not handled properly or immediately treated, both the woman and the fetus can suffer a variety of long term complications, the most serious of which is death. There is no "quick fix" to prolonged labor, but there are preventive measures that can be taken, such as oxytocin infusions. In order to properly and safely deliver the baby, doctors will often intervene in child birth and conduct assisted vaginal delivery through the use of forceps or a vacuum extractor, or perform a Caesarean section.

== Signs and symptoms ==
Symptoms include:

- Labor extends beyond 18 hours
- Dehydration and exhaustion of the mother
- Pain around the back, sides, and thighs of the mother as a result of extreme muscle pressure
- Severe pain when labor begins
- Increased heart rate of the mother
- Swollen large intestine on either side of the uterus as a result of gas build up
- Uterus sensitivity
- Ketosis
- Distress of the fetus
- Uterine ruptures

=== Complications ===
- Distress to the fetus as a result of decreasing oxygen levels
- Internal bleeding of the fetus's head (intracranial hemorrhage)
- Higher chance of operative delivery
- Risks of long-term injuries to the infant such as hypoxic-ischemic encephalopathy (HIE) or cerebral palsy
- Infection of the uterus
- Damage to the birth canal
- Postpartum infection
- Postpartum hemorrhage

=== Prolonged latent labor ===
The term describes labor that occurs very slowly. This does not necessarily mean that the woman or fetus's health is being compromised, but it is painful and is an important indication for doctors to pay attention to warning signs of prolonged labor.

=== Prolonged active labor ===
The phase of labor that extends into multiple hours (at least 14). The cervix usually dilates to over 4 cm before active labor occurs. When it first begins, it is encouraged that women stand up, walk around, and eat or drink. If failure to progress extends beyond this point, preventive measures need to be taken.

== Causes ==
=== Fetal malpresentations ===
Fetal malpresentations are irregular positions of the crown of the fetal head in relation to the mother's pelvis (the fetus is in an abnormal position). Some important ways to manage fetal malpresentation are making rapid evaluations of the condition of the women pertaining to vital signs as well as the heart rate of the fetus. If fetal heart rate is abnormal, and if membranes have ruptured and amniotic fluid is atypical, it is important for medical professionals to determine the presenting part of the fetus and the position of the fetal head. Possible delivery methods, if this is the case, are compound presentation, vaginal breech delivery, or caesarean section for breech presentation depending upon the severity of the malposition.

=== Uterine contractions ===
This refers to uterine conditions that result in the uterus not having enough coordination or strength to dilate the cervix and push the baby through the birth canal. Issues with uterine contractions are the main cause of prolonged labor during the latent phase. Contractions may not occur as of a result of uterine tumors. In addition, if the uterus is stretched, usually due to previous pregnancies or multiple gestation, contractions may be difficult. Irregular or weak contractions can be fixed through stimulation of the uterus or oxytocin infusions. Lack of contractions may be caused by an overwhelming amount of painkillers or anesthesia, by which the medications should be discontinued. In this case, it is appropriate for assisted vaginal delivery to be conducted.

=== Cervical stenosis ===
Cervical dystocia, or stenosis, occurs when the cervix fails to dilate after a practical amount of time during positive uterine pains. The main problems in cervical dystocia is the lack of uterine inertia and cervical abnormalities, which prevent the cervix from fully dilating. It is very typical of patients that have hypopituitarism. There are many preexisting complications that may result in stenosis. Common conditions that lead to stenosis are tumors, a full bladder, large size of the infant, multiple pregnancies, delay in rupture of membranes, or problems with the cervix. High stress may interfere with the progression of pregnancy in cases such as these, leading to prolonged labor.

=== Cephalopelvic disproportion ===
Cephalopelvic disproportion is the issue that arises when the fetus' body or head is too large to pass through the woman’s pelvis. Common conditions that lead to CPD are diabetes, multiple pregnancies, small or abnormally shaped pelvis, atypical fetal positions, hereditary factors, and first time pregnancies. Medical professionals can usually estimate if fetal size is too large based on ultrasounds, but they are not always entirely accurate. Doctors typically determine CPD when labor begins and the use of oxytocin is not effective. The safest way for delivery to take place when CPD is a factor is through Caesarean sections.

== Prevention ==
If the woman is being closely monitored and begins to show signs of prolonged labor, medical professionals can take preventive measures to better the chances of delivery within 24 hours. A precise initial diagnosis of prolonged labor based on signs and symptoms is extremely important in applying proper precautionary treatment. Oxytocin infusions upon an initial amniotomy is typically used to move normal labor back on track. The application of oxytocin is only effective if administered on the basis of fetal distress. This treatment method only pertains to specific states of the fetus. If the baby is experiencing malpresentation, for example, the only safe and reliable method to proceed with childbirth is medical interference.

== Management ==
In terms of medical care, preventive treatment or assisted delivery are typically the first options doctors consider. There is usually no quick fix to prolonged labor, especially if preventive measures do not revert the mother back to normal labor. Often, medical professionals resort to intervention methods. If the state of the fetus and mother are not especially serious or threatening to their health, doctors will perform assisted vaginal deliveries.

=== Assisted vaginal delivery ===
There are two different methods of assisted vaginal delivery that medical professionals typically utilize to aid in delivery in order to avoid surgical methods of fetal extraction. These procedures are only applied if a vaginal delivery has proven to still be safe to the woman and the baby, based on their vital signs. Assisted vaginal delivery is usually only used in the latent phase. Delivery during the active phase is usually associated with more complications for the woman. One approach to assisted vaginal delivery is the use of forceps. The forceps doctors use resemble two large salad spoons and are inserted into the cervix, around the baby's head and help to guide it out of the birth canal. The other option is the use of vacuum extraction. Vacuums used have a cup on the end and are inserted into the cervix. The cup attaches to the fetus's head by suction and aids in guiding delivery. The choice between forceps and vacuum extraction is usually made by the doctor based on preference. It is important that these methods are used properly, or else they can cause severe birth injuries to the baby that may be permanent.

=== Caesarean sections ===
Caesarean sections, also referred to as C-sections, are usually quick solutions to the issue of failure to progress. Often, C-sections are the best options to avoid harming the fetus or the woman, especially if labor proves to be life-threatening. One third of C-sections occur as a result of prolonged labor. C-sections are usually a necessary measure in prolonged labor to avoid serious birth complications. If the mother reaches the active phase of prolonged labor, a C-section is the safest solution. Caesarean sections need to be performed immediately if there are signs of fetal distress, uterine rupture, or cord prolapse. It is important that medical professionals are equipped and prepared in the case of an imperative C-section. There is a window of time by which Caesarean sections need to be executed if any warning signs present themselves. If there is a delay in the C-section, permanent damage can result to the baby, such as cerebral palsy or hypoxic-ischemic encephalopathy (HIE). Due to all the risk factors that are present in the event of prolonged labor, it is extremely important that medical teams are well-suited and prepared to conduct a C-section if needed.
