= Artificial rupture of membranes =

Obstetrical procedure

- Other names: amniotomy
- Specialty: Obstetrics
- ICD-9-CM: 73.0

Artificial rupture of membranes (AROM), also known as an amniotomy, is performed by a midwife or obstetrician and was once thought to be an effective means to induce or accelerate labor. The membranes can be ruptured using a specialized tool, such as an amnihook or amnicot, or they may be ruptured by the proceduralist's finger. The different techniques for artificial rupture of membranes have not been extensively compared in the literature. In one study comparing amnihook versus amnicot for artificial rupture of membranes, use of an amnicot was associated with fewer neonatal scalp lacerations.

With the amnihook method, a sterile plastic hook is inserted into the vagina and used to puncture the membranes containing the amniotic fluid. With the membranes punctured, amniotic fluid is able to escape from the uterus and exit the vagina. The absence of a fluid buffer between the fetus and uterus stimulates uterine contractions, which are also promoted by the rush of prostaglandins from the amniotic fluid.

== Medical uses ==
There are four main reasons for performing an amniotomy:

1. To induce labor or augment uterine activity, despite evidence showing lack of effectiveness. A 2013 Cochrane Review concluded, that "the evidence showed no shortening of the length of first stage of labour and a possible increase in caesarean section. Routine amniotomy is not recommended as part of standard labour management and care." Another Cochrane Review could not draw any conclusions about the effectiveness of using amniotomy as a means of induction when comparing amniotomy alone vs. expected management or amniotomy alone vs. oxytocin alone.

2. To enable the doctor or midwife to monitor the baby's heartbeat internally. A scalp electrode is placed against the baby's head and an ECG of the baby's heart beat can be directly recorded. This provides a much more reliable indication of the fetal well being than external monitoring alone. Internal fetal monitoring is often performed if there is a complication such as maternal disease, or if there is fetal distress or if the mother is being induced.

3. To check the color of the fluid. If there is a suspicion of the presence of meconium (the contents of the baby's bowel), certain preparations must be made. Suctioning must be set up and more personnel are required to be in attendance.

4. To avoid having the baby aspirate the contents of the amniotic sac at the moment of birth. Most often, the amniotic sac will break of its own accord, most often by the beginning of the second stage of labor. If it remains intact, it is sure to break with maternal pushing efforts. But in a rare case, the baby can be born with an intact bag that must be quickly broken to allow the baby to breathe.

In some cases, the amniotic sac may also be broken if the mother can feel the sac bulging, and is feeling pressure in her vagina due to this.

There is no good evidence as of 2014 regarding if antibiotics before the procedure affects outcomes.

== Risks ==
1. The baby may turn to a breech position, making birth more difficult if the membranes are ruptured before head engagement.
2. There is an increased risk of umbilical cord prolapse.
3. There is an increased risk of infection if there is a prolonged time between rupture and birth.

== Criteria ==
There are certain criteria for an amniotomy to be performed:
1. The mother should have no contraindications for vaginal delivery.
2. The mother should be in labor or have an indication for delivery.
3. The head should be engaged (0 station or more).

== See also ==
- Rupture of membranes
- Amniotic sac
