= Umbilical cord prolapse =

Complication of pregnancy

- Other names: Cord prolapse, prolapsed cord
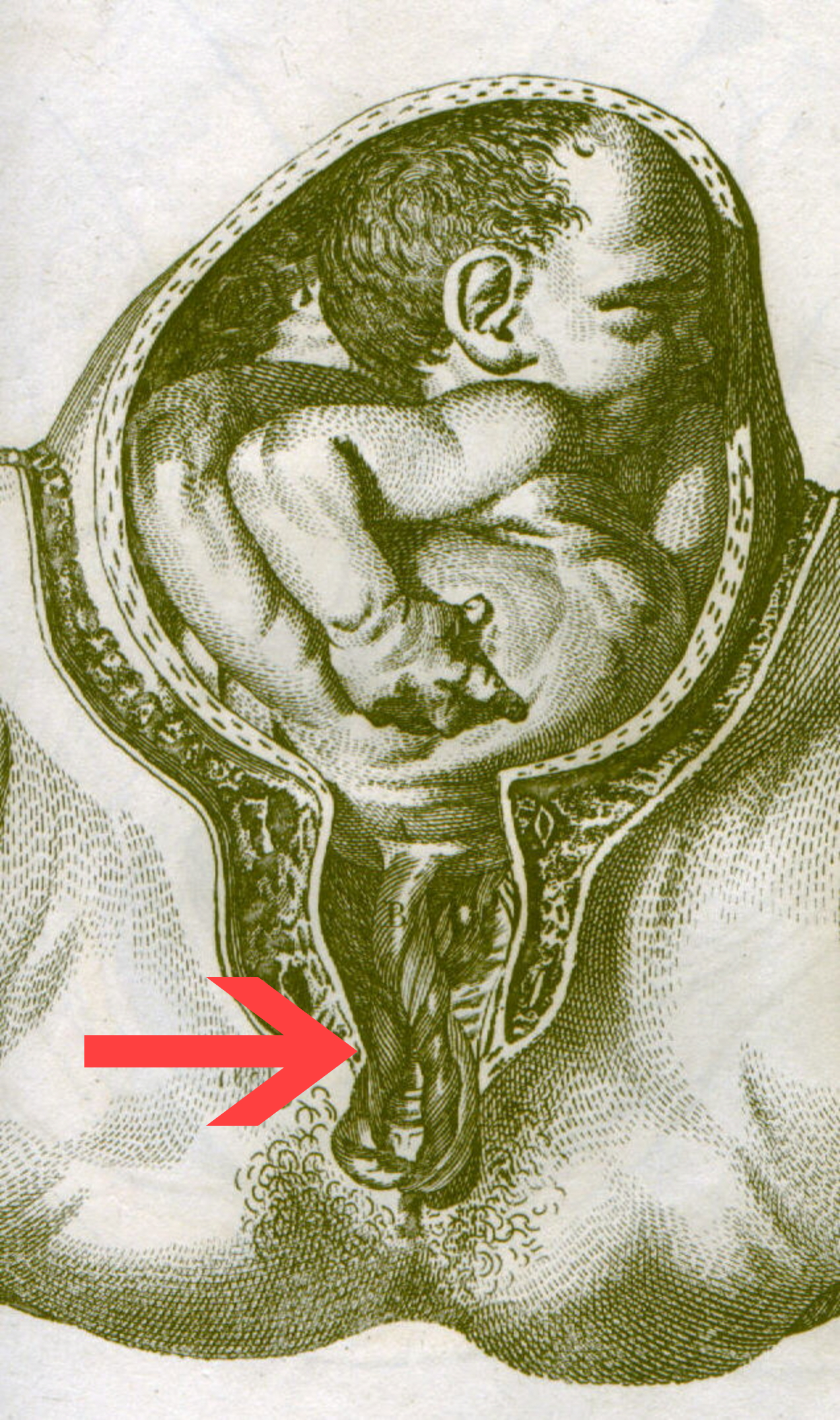
- Cord prolapse, as depicted in 1792
- Specialty: Obstetrics
- Risk factors: Abnormal position of the baby, prematurity, twin pregnancy, multiple prior pregnancies
- Diagnostic method: Suspected based on a sudden decrease in baby's heart rate during labor, confirmed by seeing or feeling the cord in the vagina
- Differential diagnosis: Abruptio placentae
- Treatment: Rapid delivery, usually by cesarean section.
- Prognosis: Risk of death of the baby 10%
- Frequency: < 1% of pregnancies

Umbilical cord prolapse is when the umbilical cord comes out of the uterus with or before the presenting part of the baby. The concern with cord prolapse is that pressure on the cord from the baby will compromise blood flow to the baby. It usually occurs during labor but can occur anytime after the rupture of membranes.

The greatest risk factors are an abnormal position of the baby within the uterus and a premature or small baby. Other risk factors include a multiple pregnancy, more than one previous delivery, and too much amniotic fluid. Whether medical rupture of the amniotic sac is a risk is controversial. The diagnosis should be suspected if there is a sudden decrease in the baby's heart rate during labor. Seeing or feeling the cord confirms the diagnosis.

Management focuses on quick delivery, usually by cesarean section. Filling the bladder or pushing up the baby by hand is recommended until this can take place. Sometimes women will be placed in a knee-chest position or the Trendelenburg position in order to help prevent further cord compression. With appropriate management, the majority of cases have good outcomes.

Umbilical cord prolapse occurs in about 1 in 500 pregnancies. The risk of death of the baby is about 10%. However, much of this risk is due to congenital anomalies or prematurity. It is considered an emergency.

== Signs and symptoms ==
The first sign of umbilical cord prolapse is usually a sudden and severe decrease in fetal heart rate that does not immediately resolve. On fetal heart tracing (a linear recording of the fetal heart rate) this would usually look like moderate to severe variable decelerations. In overt cord prolapse, the cord can be seen or felt on the vulva or vagina.

The main issue with cord prolapse is that, once the cord is prolapsed, it is prone to compression by the foetus and the womb. This can cause decrease in oxygen supply to the foetus which can be fatal.

A majority of umbilical cord prolapse cases happen during the second stage of labor.

== Risk factors ==
Risk factors that are associated with umbilical cord prolapse tend to make it difficult for the baby from appropriately engaging and filling the maternal pelvis or are related to abnormalities of the umbilical cord. The two major categories of risk factors are spontaneous and iatrogenic (those that result from medical intervention).

- spontaneous factors:
  - fetal malpresentation: abnormal fetal lie tends to result in space below the baby in the maternal pelvis, which can then be occupied by the cord.
  - polyhydramnios, or an abnormally high amount of amniotic fluid
  - prematurity: likely related to increased chance of malpresentation and relative polyhydramnios.
  - low birth weight: usually described as <2500g at birth, though some studies will use <1500g. Cause is likely similar to those for prematurity.
  - multiple gestation, or being pregnant with more than one baby at a given time: more likely to occur in the baby that is not born first.
  - spontaneous rupture of membranes: about half of prolapses occur within 5 minutes of membrane rupture, two-thirds within 1 hour, 95% within 24 hours.
- treatment associated factors:
  - artificial rupture of membranes
  - placement of internal monitors (for example, internal scalp electrode or intrauterine pressure catheter)
  - manual rotation of fetal head

== Diagnosis ==
Umbilical cord prolapse should always be considered a possibility when there is a sudden decrease in fetal heart rate or variable decelerations, particularly after the rupture of membranes. With overt prolapses, the diagnosis can be confirmed if the cord can be felt on vaginal examination. Without overt prolapse, the diagnosis can only be confirmed after a cesarean section, though even then it will not always be evident at time of procedure.

=== Classification ===
There are three types of umbilical prolapse that can occur:

- overt umbilical cord prolapse: descent of the umbilical cord past the presenting fetal part. In this case, the cord is through the cervix and into or beyond the vagina. Overt umbilical cord prolapse requires rupture of membranes. This is the most common type of cord prolapse.
- occult umbilical prolapse: descent of the umbilical cord alongside the presenting fetal part, but has not advanced past the presenting fetal part. Occult umbilical prolapse can occur with both intact or ruptured membranes.
- funic (cord) presentation: presence of the umbilical cord between the presenting fetal part and fetal membranes. In this case, the cord has not passed the opening of the cervix. In funic presentation, the membranes are not yet ruptured.

== Management ==
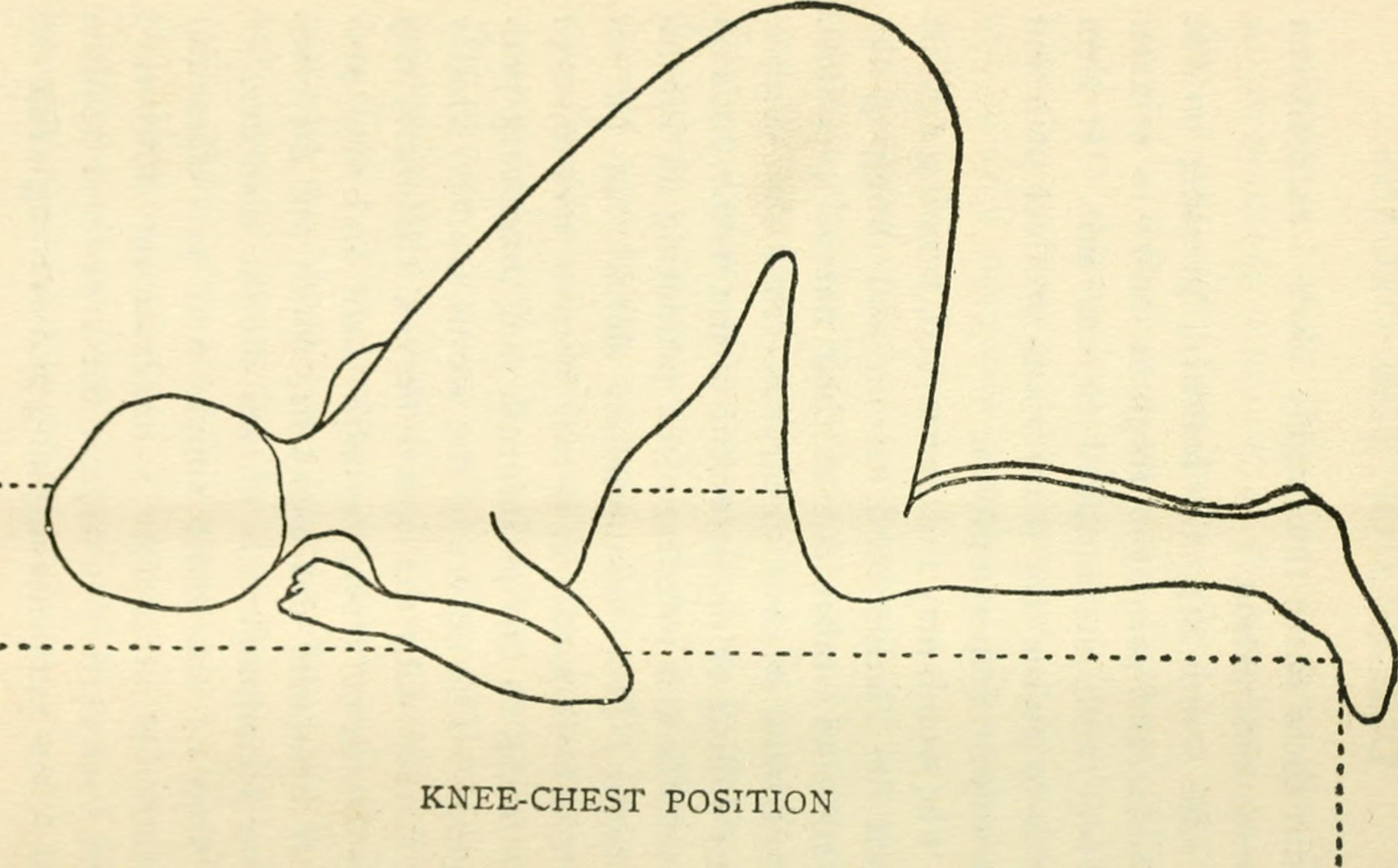
The knee-chest position is typically recommended

The typical treatment of umbilical cord prolapse in the setting of a viable pregnancy involves immediate delivery by the quickest and safest route possible. This usually requires cesarean section, especially if the woman is in early labor. Occasionally, vaginal delivery will be attempted if clinical judgment determines that is a safer or quicker method.

Other interventions during management of cord prolapse are typically used to decrease the chance of complications while preparations for delivery are being made. These interventions are focused on reducing pressure on the cord to prevent fetal complications from cord compression. The following maneuvers are among those used in clinical practice:

- Manual elevation of the presenting fetal part.
- Repositioning of the mother to be in the knee-chest position or Trendelenburg position (head down with feet elevated), lying on left side is usually preferred.
- Filling of the bladder using a foley catheter can help elevate the presenting fetal part and lift it off the cord.
- Use of tocolytics (medications to suppress labor) have been proposed, usually done in addition to bladder filling rather than as a stand-alone intervention.

If the mother is far from delivery, funic reduction (manually placing the cord back into the uterine cavity) has been attempted, with successful cases reported. However, this is not currently recommended by the Royal College of Obstetricians and Gynaecologists (RCOG), as there is insufficient evidence to support this maneuver.

== Outcomes ==
The primary concern with umbilical cord prolapse is inadequate blood supply, and thus oxygen, to the baby if the cord becomes compressed. The cord can become compressed either due to mechanical pressure (usually from the presenting fetal part) or from sudden contraction of the vessels due to decreased temperatures in the vagina in comparison to the uterus. This can lead to death of the baby or other complications.

Historically, the rate of fetal death in the setting of cord prolapse has been as high 40%. However, these estimates occurred in the context of home or births outside of the hospital. When considering cord prolapses that have occurred in inpatient labor and delivery settings, the rate drops to as low as 0-3%, though the mortality rate remains higher than for babies without cord prolapse. The reduction in mortality for hospital births is likely due to the ready availability of immediate cesarean section.

Many other fetal outcomes have been studied, including Apgar score (a quick assessment of a newborn's health status) at 5 minutes and length of hospitalization after delivery. While both measures are worse for newborns delivered after cord prolapse, it is unclear what effect this has in the long-term. Relatively large studies that have tried to quantify long-term effects of cord prolapse on children found that less than 1% (1 in 120 studied) had a major neurologic disability, and less than 1% (110 in 16,675) had diagnosed cerebral palsy.

== Epidemiology ==
Rates of umbilical cord prolapse ranges from 0.1 to 0.6% of all pregnancies. This rate has remained stable over time. A recent study estimates 77% of cord prolapses occur in singleton pregnancies (where there is only one baby). In twin pregnancies, cord prolapses occur more frequently in the second twin to be delivered, with 9% in the first twin and 14% in the second twin.
