= Vibroacoustic stimulation =

Antenatal test of fetal heart rate

Vibroacoustic stimulation (VAS), sometimes referred to as fetal vibroacoustic stimulation or fetal acoustic stimulation test (FAST), is the application of a vibratory sound stimulus to the abdomen of a pregnant woman to induce FHR (fetal heart rate) accelerations. The presence of FHR accelerations reliably predicts the absence of fetal metabolic acidemia. Vibroacoustic stimulation is typically used during a nonstress test (NST).

In 2013, the Cochrane Database of Systematic Reviews concluded that there was insufficient evidence from randomized trials to support its use to assess fetal well-being in labor. A related Cochrane Review, however, concluded that its use in antenatal testing did reduce the incidence of non-reactive cardiotocography and the overall testing time.
