= Labor induction =

Artificial stimulation of childbirth

- Other names: induction of labor, labour induction
- ICD-9-CM: 73.0-73.1

Labor induction is the procedure where a medical professional starts the process of labor (giving birth) instead of letting it start on its own. Labor may be induced (started) if the health of the mother or the baby is at risk. Induction of labor can be accomplished with pharmaceutical or non-pharmaceutical methods.

In Western countries, it is estimated that one-quarter of pregnant women have their labor medically induced with drug treatment. Inductions are most often performed either with prostaglandin drug treatment alone, or with a combination of prostaglandin and intravenous oxytocin treatment.

== Causes ==
Commonly accepted medical reasons for induction include:

- Postterm pregnancy, i.e. if the pregnancy has gone past the end of the 42nd week.
- Intrauterine fetal growth restriction.
- There are health risks to the woman in continuing the pregnancy (e.g. pre-eclampsia).
- Premature rupture of the membranes; this is when the membranes have ruptured, but labor does not start within a specific amount of time.
- Premature termination of the pregnancy (abortion).
- Fetal death in utero and previous history of stillbirth.
- Twin pregnancy continuing beyond 38 weeks.
- Previous health conditions that puts risk on the woman and/or her child such as diabetes, high blood pressure.
- High body mass index.
- Macrosomia.

Induction of labor in those who are either at or after term improves outcomes for newborns and decreases the number of C-sections performed.

== Methods ==
Methods of inducing labor include pharmacological medication, mechanical methods, surgical methods, combined methods and alternative methods. The choice of method depends on maternal characteristics, clinical guidelines, practitioner experience, and available resources.

Mechanical and physical approaches can include artificial rupture of membranes or membrane sweeping. Membrane sweeping may lead to more women spontaneously going into labor (and fewer women having labor induction) but it may make little difference to the risk of maternal or neonatal death, or to the number of women having c-sections or spontaneous vaginal births. There are also risks associated with membrane sweeping. The risks include irregular contractions, bleeding, and in 1 out of every 10 women an amniotic sac rupture, which can lead to a formal induction within 24 hours of the rupture if labor hasn't been induced.

The use of intrauterine catheters are also indicated. These work by compressing the cervix mechanically to generate release on prostaglandins in local tissues. There is no direct effect on the uterus. Results from a 2021 systematic review found no differences in cesarean delivery nor neonatal outcomes in women with low-risk pregnancies between inpatient nor outpatient cervical ripening.

=== Medication ===
- Intravaginal, endocervical or extra-amniotic administration of prostaglandin, such as dinoprostone or misoprostol. Prostaglandin E2 is the most studied compound and with most evidence behind it. A range of different dosage forms are available with a variety of routes possible. The use of misoprostol has been extensively studied but normally in small, poorly defined studies. Only a very few countries have approved misoprostol for use in induction of labor.
- Intravenous (IV) administration of synthetic oxytocin preparations is used to artificially induce labor if it is deemed medically necessary. A high dose of oxytocin does not seem to have greater benefits than a standard dose. There are risks associated with IV oxytocin induced labor. Risks include the women having induced contractions that are too vigorous, too close together (frequent), or that last too long, which may lead to added stress on the baby (changes in baby's heart rate) and may require the mother to have an emergency caesarean section. There is no high quality evidence to indicate if IV oxytocin should be stopped once a woman reaches active labor in order to reduce the incidence of women requiring caesarean sections.
- Use of mifepristone has been described but is rarely used in practice.
- Relaxin has been investigated, but is not currently commonly used.
- mnemonic; ARNOP: Antiprogesterone, relaxin, nitric oxide donors, oxytocin, prostaglandins

=== Non-pharmaceutical ===
- Membrane sweep, also known as membrane stripping, Hamilton maneuver, or "stretch and sweep". The procedure is carried out by a midwife or doctor as part of an internal vaginal examination. The midwife or doctor inserts lubricated, gloved fingers into the vagina and inserts their index finger into the opening of the cervix or neck of the womb. They then use a circular movement to try to separate the membranes of the amniotic sac, containing the baby, from the cervix. This action, which releases hormones called prostaglandins, may prepare the cervix for birth and may initiate labour. While this process can cause discomfort, bleeding, and irregular contractions and carries the risk of breaking the amniotic sack, many would still choose to have membrane sweeping carried out for their next birth.
- Artificial rupture of the membranes (AROM or ARM) ("breaking the waters")
- Extra-amniotic saline infusion (EASI), in which a Foley catheter is inserted into the cervix and the distal portion expanded to dilate it and to release prostaglandins.
- Cook Medical Double Balloon known as the Cervical Ripening Balloon with Stylet for assisted placement is approved by the FDA in the United States. The Double balloon provides one balloon to be inflated with saline on one side of the uterine side of the cervix and the second balloon to be inflated with saline on the vaginal side of the cervix.

=== Combined methods ===
Combined methods involve the use of more than one induction technique, such as amniotomy together with intravenous oxytocin, or mechanical methods combined with pharmacological agents.

=== Alternative methods ===
- Alternative methods of inducing labour include approaches such as acupuncture, castor oil, herbal preparations, homeopathy, and sexual intercourse. Evidence regarding their effectiveness and safety remains limited, and major clinical guidelines do not recommend their routine use. Castor oil, although effective can cause meconium aspiration sydrome.

== Timing and risks ==
Labor induction before 39 weeks of pregnancy is not recommended unless there the mother or her child would be at risk otherwise. Some medical guidelines recommend waiting until 41 weeks with low-risk pregnancies before induction. Doctors and pregnant women should have a discussion of risks and benefits when considering an induction of labor in the absence of an accepted medical indication.

Inducing labor before 39 weeks in the absence of a medical indication (such as hypertension, intrauterine growth restriction, or pre-eclampsia) increases the risk of complications of prematurity including difficulties with respiration, infection, feeding, jaundice, neonatal intensive care unit admissions, and perinatal death. Inducing labor after 34 weeks and before 37 weeks in women with pregnancy-related hypertensive disorders (pre-eclampsia, eclampsia, gestational hypertension) may lead to better outcomes for the woman but does not improve or worsen outcomes for the baby.

Postterm pregnancies lasting beyond 41–42 weeks are associated with increased risks of stillbirth, neonatal death and caesarean section which can be reduced by inducing labor.

If waters break (membranes rupture) between 24 and 37 weeks' gestation, waiting for the labor to start naturally with careful monitoring of the woman and baby is more likely to lead to healthier outcomes. For women over 37 weeks pregnant whose babies are suspected of not coping well in the womb, it is not yet clear from research whether it is best to have an induction or caesarean immediately, or to wait until labour happens by itself. Similarly, there is not yet enough research to show whether it is best to deliver babies prematurely if they are not coping in the womb or whether to wait so that they are less premature when they are born.

Sometimes when a woman's waters break after 37 weeks she is induced instead of waiting for labour to start naturally. This may decrease the risks of infection for the woman and baby but more research is needed to find out whether inducing is good for women and babies longer term.

Women who have had a caesarean section for a previous pregnancy are at risk of having a uterine rupture, when their caesarean scar re-opens. Uterine rupture is a serious threat for the woman and the baby, and induction of labour increases this risk further. There is not yet enough research to determine which method of induction is safest for a woman who has had a caesarean section before. There is also no research to say whether it is better for these women and their babies to have an elective caesarean section instead of being induced.

There is insufficient scientific evidence to determine if inducing a woman's labor at home is a safe and effective approach for both the woman and the baby.

=== Predicting the necessity of induction ===
Clinicians assess the odds of having a vaginal delivery after labor induction by a "Bishop score". However, recent research has questioned the relationship between the Bishop score and a successful induction, finding that a poor Bishop score actually may improve the chance for a vaginal delivery after induction. A Bishop Score is done to assess the progression of the cervix prior to an induction. In order to do this, the cervix must be checked to see how much it has effaced, thinned out, and how far dilated it is. The score goes by a points system depending on five factors. Each factor is scored on a scale of either 0–2 or 0–3, any total score less than 5 holds a higher risk of delivering by caesarean section.

== Women's experiences ==
Women often do not receive clear and detailed information about the process of labor induction, its benefits and risks. For example women might not know how long the process will last, how long they need to stay in the hospital and how strong the pain caused by the procedure would be. Providing up-to-date information about the procedure allows women to make an informed choice and give an informed consent or refuse the induction.

Many women reported feeling that they were not involved in making the decision whether to induce labor and that this decision is made for them instead. Others reported feeling forgotten or alone in relation to the procedure, not being listened to and the severity of their pain being questioned. Some reported feeling they did not have a choice other than vaginal delivery but others reported being able to choose the date of induction and the method of giving birth.

Even though women reported seeing hospitals as a safe place for labor induction and giving birth, for some it is also considered an anxiety-inducing setting where they are restricted and not allowed to move around or see family members.

== Criticisms ==
Membrane sweeping, a common method of labor induction, can cause bleeding and irregular contractions and is often done without informed consent by the pregnant person.

The medical rationale for performing an induction is decreasing the risk of stillbirth. However, the probability of having a stillbirth post-term is very small, meaning that for the vast majority of post-term pregnancies, inductions are unnecessary. Approximately 500 inductions are performed in order to avoid 1 stillbirth. Many of these unnecessary inductions could potentially provoke other risks, forcing medical practitioners to perform other interventions such as caesarean sections. These additional interventions could cause labor to be more risky for the pregnant person.

Another criticism of inductions is that the pregnant person's bodily autonomy is overlooked. Many pregnant people might not want to be induced, and rather share in the decision-making process with their medical practitioner.

Induced labor may be more painful for the woman as one of the side effects of intravenous oxytocin is increased contraction pains, mainly due to the rigid onset. This may lead to the increased use of analgesics and other pain-relieving pharmaceuticals. These interventions may also lead to an increased likelihood of caesarean section delivery for the baby. However after 41 weeks of gestation there is a reduction of cesarean deliveries when the labour is induced.

The Institute for Safe Medication Practices labeled pitocin a "high-alert medication" because of the high likelihood of "significant patient harm when it is used in error."

== See also ==
- Tocolytic, labor suppressant
