= Trial of labour =

Concept in obstetrics

In obstetrics a trial of labour is the conduction of spontaneous labour in a moderate degree of cephalopelvic disproportion. It is performed under close observation by an obstetrician in order to assess a woman's chances of a successful vaginal birth. The physician may allow labor to continue against contraindications during birth or even stimulate labor with oxytocin when pelvic measurements are borderline to see if the fetal head will descend making vaginal delivery possible; if progressive changes in dilation and station do not occur, a cesarean delivery is performed.
