= Placental alpha microglobulin-1 (PAMG-1) =

Placental alpha microglobulin-1 (PAMG-1) is a human protein that was first isolated in 1975 from amniotic fluid. PAMG-1 is an important biomarker for the detection of premature rupture of fetal membrane (PROM) The high concentration of PAMG-1 in amniotic fluid means it can be used to detect if this fluid is present in the cervico-vaginal discharge of pregnant women; the presence of PAMG-1 in the discharge suggests that amniotic fluid is present, and therefore suggests that PROM has occurred. PAMG-1 was originally referred to as specific alpha-1 globulin of placenta.

PAMG-1 is present in blood and the amniotic fluid and cervico-vaginal discharge of pregnant women. The concentration of PAMG-1 in the amniotic fluid of pregnant women (2,000–25,000 ng/ml), however, is several thousand magnitudes higher than that found in their background cervico-vaginal discharge when the fetal membranes are intact (0.05–0.2 ng/ml). It has been found to be present in amniotic fluid in significantly high concentrations throughout all three trimesters of pregnancy.

== Diagnostic potential ==
Because of its contrasting concentrations in the amniotic fluid and background cervico-vaginal discharge of pregnant women, PAMG-1 proves to be an excellent protein marker for amniotic fluid. Detecting amniotic fluid via PAMG-1 becomes particularly important when determining whether or not fetal membranes are ruptured. Premature rupture of fetal membranes (or PROM as it is more commonly referred) occurs in roughly 10% of pregnancies and is one of the most common diagnoses associated with premature delivery and neonatal complications that requires admission to the NICU. Risks of neonatal complications as a result of PROM can include infection, preterm delivery, fetal distress, prolapsed cord, and abruptio placenta.

Placental alpha macroglobulin-1 (PAMG-1) has been the subject of over 20 clinical investigations, the majority of which have focused on the antigen’s ability to detect premature rupture of the fetal membranes (ROM) in non-laboring pregnant women presenting with unexplainable vaginal leakage. A small sub-segment of these investigations, however, have evaluated the ability of PAMG-1 to assess the risk of preterm delivery in pregnant patients presenting with signs or symptoms of preterm labor. The results of these studies suggested that a test for PAMG-1 that is more sensitive than the one investigated initially may prove to be a very powerful predictor of imminent spontaneous preterm delivery in patients with threatened preterm labor. Such a device was soon developed (commercially known as the PartoSure test) and was initially evaluated in a multicenter, multinational pilot study, that included 101 consecutively recruited pregnant women with singleton pregnancies who presented with symptoms of preterm labor, clinically intact amniotic membranes, and minimal cervical dilatation. In this group, the PartoSure test provided a 97.4% and 93.6% negative predictive value, and 78.3% and 87.0% positive predictive value for the prediction of imminent spontaneous delivery within ≤7 and ≤14 days, respectively, and 90.0% and 80.0% sensitivity and 93.8% and 96.1% specificity for ≤7 and ≤14 days, respectively.

A second peer-reviewed, published study by this same group of authors involved 203 patients and sought to compare the PartoSure test to standard methods for assessing the risk of preterm delivery in patients with preterm labor. The authors concluded that PAMG-1 detection by PartoSure is the single best predictor of imminent spontaneous delivery within 7 days compared to cervical length measurement via transvaginal ultrasound with a cutoff of 25mm (CL), and fetal fibronectin testing (fFN) via a commercially available, rapid test. Furthermore, the authors suggested that the statistical superiority of PartoSure to fFN and CL with respect to SP and PPV (P < 0.01) provided evidence that PartoSure may serve to significantly enhance current practice and ultimately reduce unnecessary hospital admissions. The Spanish Society of Obstetricians and Gynecologists (SEGO) recently reported in its 2014 Preterm Labor Guidelines that, “[a]lthough the PPV and the sensitivity of PAMG-1 are the highest, the main utility of this test [PartoSure], as is the measurement of cervical length, is its high negative predictive value; its prognostic capacity increases in populations with high prevalence of prematurity. For this reason it [PAMG-1] has been used in women with a shortened cervix and may be useful for clinical decision making and the use of tocolytics, the use of corticosteroids or monitoring of these patients.”

== Diagnostic applications ==
The diagnostic capability of the PAMG-1 protein has originally been used by an immunoassay that employs a series of monoclonal antibodies (MABs) to the PAMG-1 protein. This immunoassay detects the presence of PAMG-1 in the cervico-vaginal discharge of pregnant woman and has been shown to detect rupture of membranes with approximately 99% accuracy. In 2014, an unprecedented study involving 140 patients was published that compared this device to a seldom-used, invasive gold standard for diagnosing rupture of membranes called the indigo carmine test. The results of this study showed a 99% correlation between the two tests and led the investigators to propose the use of the noninvasive PAMG-1 test in situations where the use of the invasive dye test is not practical.

Additionally, and in light of early research suggesting a diagnostic application of PAMG-1 detection as a test to assess the risk of imminent spontaneous preterm birth, a commercial test known as the PartoSure test was developed and has been the subject of several peer-reviewed publications suggesting its superiority to conventional methods for assessing the risk of preterm birth (i.e. fetal fibronectin testing and cervical length measurement via transvaginal ultrasound). Di Renzo et al. report, "That the PartoSure test was found to be statistically superior to fFN fetal fibronectin and CL [cervical length measurement via transvaginal ultrasound] with respect to SP specificity and PPV positive predictive value (P < 0.01) provides evidence toward being able to significantly enhance current practice to ultimately reduce the unnecessary administration of potentially harmful therapeutics to patients, as well as reduce the economic burden associated with unnecessary hospital admissions." In this study, the sensitivities for PartoSure (PAMG-1, n=203), fetal fibronectin (fFN, n=66), and cervical length measurement via transvaginal ultrasound (CL, n=203) for predicting imminent spontaneous preterm birth within 7 days were 80%, 50%, and 57%, respectively. The specificities were 95%, 72%, and 73% for PAMG-1, fFN and CL, respectively. The NPVs were 96%, 87%, and 89% for PAMG-1, fFN and CL, respectively. The PPVs were 76%, 29%, and 30% for PAMG-1, fFN and CL, respectively.

== Additional resources ==
- Caughey, A. B.; Robinson, J. N.; Norwitz, E. R. (2008). "Contemporary Diagnosis and Management of Preterm Premature Rupture of Membranes". Reviews in Obstetrics & Gynecology. 1 (1): 11–22. PMC 2492588. PMID 18701929.
- Chen, Frank; Dudenhausen, Joachim (2008). "Comparison of Two Rapid Strip Tests Based on IGFBP-1 and PAMG-1 for the Detection of Amniotic Fluid". American Journal of Perinatology. 25 (4): 243–246. doi:10.1055/s-2008-1066876. PMID 18548399. S2CID 2219288.
