= Rupture of membranes =

Rupture of the amniotic sac in pregnancy

Rupture of membranes (ROM) or amniorrhexis is a term used during pregnancy to describe a rupture of the amniotic sac. Normally, it occurs spontaneously at full term either during or at the beginning of labor. Rupture of the membranes is known colloquially as "breaking (one's) water," especially when induced rather than spontaneous, or as one's "water breaking". A premature rupture of membranes (PROM) is a rupture of the amnion that occurs at full term and prior to the onset of labor.

In cases of PROM, options include expectant management without intervention, or interventions such as oxytocin or other methods of labor induction, and both are usually accompanied by close monitoring of maternal and fetal health. Preterm premature rupture of membranes (PPROM) is when water breaks both before the onset of labor and before the pregnancy's 37 week gestation. In the United States, more than 120,000 pregnancies per year are affected by a premature rupture of membranes, which is the cause of about one third of preterm deliveries.

Sometimes, a child is born with no rupture of the amniotic sac (no rupture of membranes). In such cases, the child may still be entirely within the sac once born; such a birth is known as an en-caul birth. A partial caul (referred to as just caul birth, or "in the caul" birth) covers the head of the newborn, but stops there.

== Effects ==
When the amniotic sac ruptures, production of prostaglandins increases and the cushioning between the fetus and uterus is decreased, both of which are processes that increase the frequency and intensity of uterine contractions.

On occasion, with the rupture of membranes, particularly if the head is not engaged, the umbilical cord may prolapse. A cord prolapse is an obstetrical emergency, as the descending head may block fetal-placental circulation.

Once the membranes are ruptured, bacteria may ascend and could lead to amnionitis and fetal infection.

A premature rupture of membranes can have multiple effects on the fetus such as increasing their risk of prematurity and facing neonatal or perinatal complications.

Rupture of membranes can affect ongoing labor management. Certain methods of labor induction or augmentation such as balloon catheters are relatively contraindicated after ROM.

== Types ==
- SROM: spontaneous rupture of membranes. This term describes the normal, spontaneous rupture of the membranes at full term. The rupture is usually at the bottom of the uterus, over the cervix, causing a gush of fluid. This gush may be quite small (such as 50ml), or it can be significantly large (200-300ml) depending upon amount of fluid in the amniotic sac, and to what extent the fetal head is plugging the hole and retaining fluid in the sac. A spontaneous rupture that occurs early in labor may actually be related to other complications resulting in delayed labor. These complications may include a contracted pelvis, breech presentation, or occipito-posterior position.
- PROM: premature rupture of membranes. This term describes a rupture of the membranes that occurs before the onset of labor.
  - PPROM: preterm, premature rupture of membranes. This term describes a rupture of the membranes that occurs before 37 weeks gestation, and it can have multiple effects on the fetus such as increasing their risk of prematurity and facing neonatal or perinatal complications. Risk factors of pregnancies with PPROM include race (black patients are at increased risk), low socioeconomic status, history of sexually transmitted disease, distension of the uterus (which may result from factors such as excessive amniotic fluid (polyhydramnios) or carrying more than one fetus (multifetal pregnancy)), and tobacco smoking.
- AROM: artificial rupture of membranes. This term describes a rupture of the membranes by a third party, usually a midwife or obstetrician, in order to induce or accelerate labor.

== Detection ==
Detection of rupture of membranes mainly include:

- Pooling test: visualization of amniotic fluid pooling in the vagina
- Nitrazine paper test
- Fern test
- Amniotic fluid index

For results to be roughly 90% accurate in infection detection, a combination of both an arborization test and nitrazine paper test may be used. An arborization test assesses the patient's vaginal secretions, while a nitrazone paper test uses the nitrazine paper to examines vaginal pH.
