= FFN =

FFN may refer to:

- FanFiction.Net, a fan fiction archive site
- Fast Food Nation, a book by Eric Schlosser
- Fédération Française de Natation, the French Swimming Federation
- Feedforward neural network, a type of artificial neural network
- Fetal fibronectin
- Flip-Flop Nation, an exclamatory used when one wears flip-flop sandals
- For the Freedom of Nations!, an anti-colonial organization
- Free French Navy
- Friend Finder Networks, a social media website
- Full frontal nudity
- "Full Frontal Nudity", an episode of Monty Python's Flying Circus
- Future For Nature, Netherlands conservation organisation
- Radio ffn, a German radio channel
