= Amniotic fluid =

Fluid surrounding a fetus within the amnion

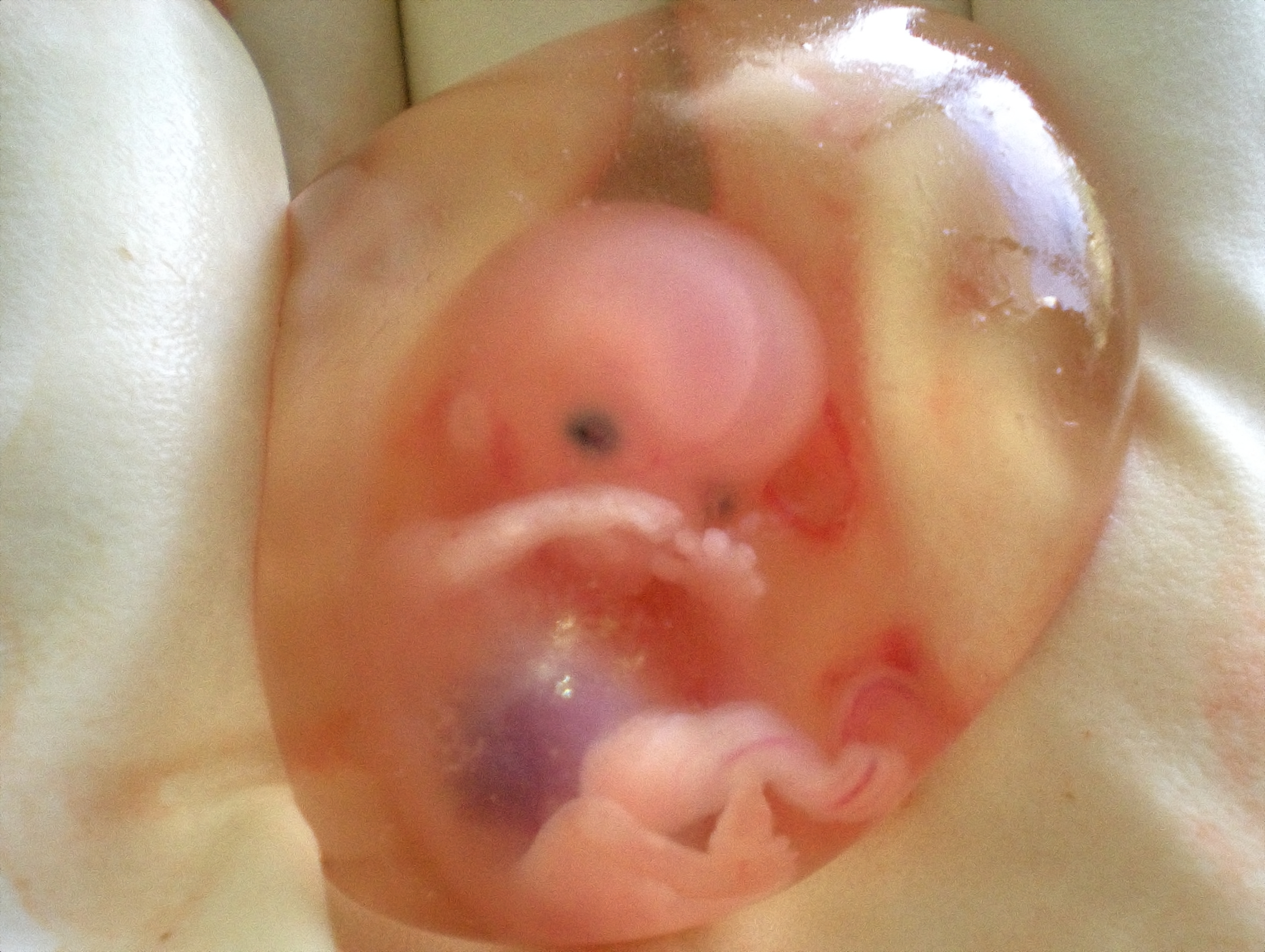
- Ten-week-old human fetus surrounded by amniotic fluid within the amniotic sac

Identifiers
- MeSH: D000653

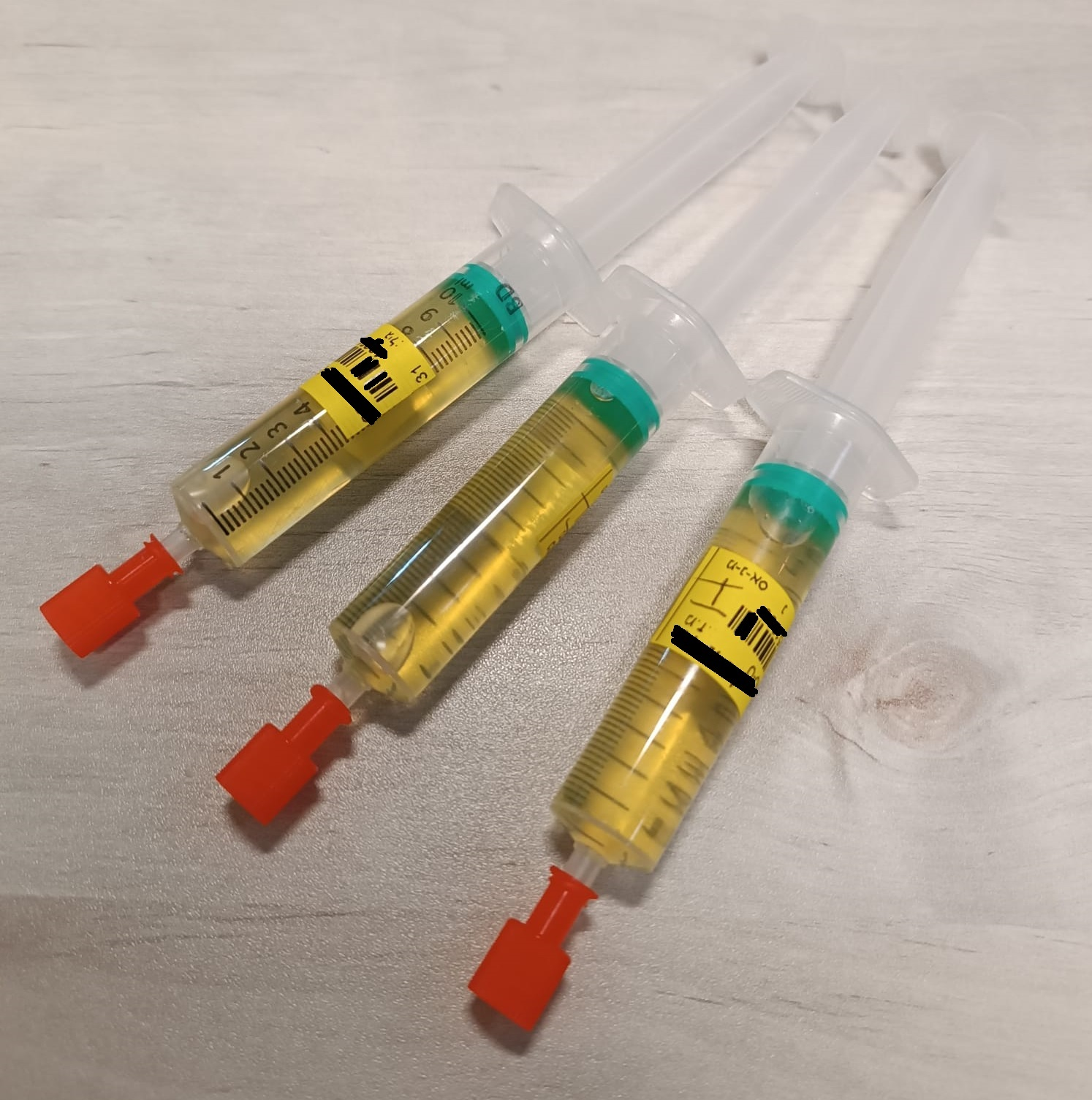
Tubes filled with amniotic fluid for amniocentesis

The amniotic fluid is the protective liquid contained by the amniotic sac of a gravid amniote. This fluid serves as a cushion for the growing fetus, but also serves to facilitate the exchange of nutrients, water, and biochemical products between mother and fetus.

Colloquially, the amniotic fluid is commonly called water or waters (Latin liquor amnii).

== Development ==
Amniotic fluid is present from the formation of the gestational sac. Amniotic fluid is in the amniotic sac. It is generated from maternal plasma, and passes through the fetal membranes by osmotic and hydrostatic forces. When fetal kidneys begin to function around week 16, fetal urine also contributes to the fluid. In earlier times, it was believed that the amniotic fluid was composed entirely of excreted fetal urine.

The fluid is absorbed through the fetal tissue and skin. After 22 to 25 weeks of pregnancy, keratinization of an embryo's skin occurs. When this process completes around the 25th week, the fluid is primarily absorbed by the fetal gut for the remainder of gestation.

=== Contents ===
At first, amniotic fluid is mainly water with electrolytes. By about the 12–14th week the liquid also contains proteins, carbohydrates, lipids and phospholipids, urea, and extracellular matrix (ECM) components including collagens and glycosaminoglycans, including hyaluronic acid and chondroitin sulfate, all of which aid in the growth of the fetus.

=== Volume ===
The volume of amniotic fluid changes with the growth of the fetus. From the tenth to the 20th week, it increases from 25 to 400 millilitres (0.88 to 14.08 imp fl oz; 0.85 to 13.53 US fl oz) approximately. Approximately in the 10th–11th week, the breathing and swallowing of the fetus slightly decrease the amount of fluid. Neither urination nor swallowing contributes significantly to fluid quantity changes until the 25th week, when keratinization of skin is complete; then the relationship between fluid and fetal growth stops. It reaches a plateau of 800 millilitres (28 imp fl oz; 27 US fl oz) by the 28-week gestational age. The amount of fluid declines to roughly 400 millilitres (14 imp fl oz; 14 US fl oz) at 42 weeks. Some sources indicate about 500 to 1,000 millilitres (18 to 35 imp fl oz; 17 to 34 US fl oz) of amniotic fluid is present at birth.

=== Rupture of membranes ===
The forewaters are released when the amnion ruptures. This is commonly known as "water breaking." When this occurs during labour at term, it is known as a "spontaneous rupture of membranes". If the rupture precedes labour at term, however, it is referred to as a prelabor rupture of membranes. Spontaneous rupture of membranes before term is referred to as a "premature rupture of membranes." The majority of the hindwaters remain inside the womb until the baby is born. Artificial rupture of membrane (ARM), a manual rupture of the amniotic sac, can also be performed to release the fluid if the amnion has not spontaneously ruptured.

== Function ==
Swallowed amniotic fluid (in later stages of development) creates urine and contributes to the formation of meconium. Amniotic fluid protects the developing fetus by cushioning against blows to the mother's abdomen, allowing for easier fetal movement, and promoting muscular/skeletal development. Amniotic fluid swallowed by the fetus helps in the formation of the gastrointestinal tract. It also protects the fetus from mechanical jerks and shocks. The fetus, which develops within a fluid-filled amniotic sac, relies on the placenta for respiratory gas exchange rather than the lungs. While not involved in fetal oxygenation, fetal breathing movements (FBM) nevertheless have an important role in lung growth and in the development of respiratory muscles and neural regulation. FBM are regulated differently in many respects than postnatal respiration, which results from the unique intrauterine environment. At birth, the transition to continuous postnatal respiration involves a fall in temperature, gaseous distention of the lungs, activation of the Hering-Breuer reflex, and functional connectivity of afferent O2 chemoreceptor activity with respiratory motoneurons and arousal centers.

== Clinical significance ==
=== Collection ===
Amniotic fluid is removed from the mother by an amniocentesis procedure, where a long needle is inserted through the abdomen into the amniotic sac, using ultrasound guidance such that the fetus is not harmed. Amniocentesis is a low-risk procedure, with a risk of pregnancy loss between 1 in 1,500 – 1 in 700 procedures. Amniocentesis can be performed to obtain diagnostic genetic information, evaluate for intrauterine infection, or, rarely, to assess for fetal lung maturity if early delivery is required. If warranted, fluid is collected between 16 and 42 weeks of fetal development. The amount of fluid removed depends on the indication for the procedure and the testing that will be performed on the fluid.

=== Analysis ===
Analysis of amniotic fluid can reveal many aspects of the baby's genetic health as well as the age and viability of the fetus. This is because the fluid contains metabolic wastes and compounds used in assessing fetal age and lung maturity, but amniotic fluid also contains fetal cells, which can be examined for genetic defects.

Amniotic fluid normally has a pH of 7.0 to 7.5. Because pH in the upper vagina is normally acidic (pH 3.8–4.5), a vaginal pH test showing a pH of more than 4.5 strengthens a suspicion of rupture of membranes in case of clear vaginal discharge in pregnancy. Other tests for detecting amniotic fluid mainly include nitrazine paper test and fern test. One main test that is performed on amniotic fluid is the L/S ratio test (lecithin/sphingomyelin). This test is used to determine fetal lung maturity. Both lecithin and sphingomyelin are lung surfactants that are present in increasing amounts in the maturing fetus, though past week 33, sphingomyelin levels remain relatively constant. Measuring a ratio of L/S of 2:1 or greater indicates that the fetus can be safely delivered, with functioning lungs.

=== Complications related to amniotic fluid ===
Too little amniotic fluid is called oligohydramnios. In a minority of cases, it can be a cause of problems for the mother and baby. These include contracture of the limbs, clubbing of the feet and hands, and also a life-threatening condition called hypoplastic lungs. The Potter sequence refers to a constellation of findings related to insufficient amniotic fluid.

On every prenatal visit, the obstetrician, gynaecologist, or midwife should measure the patient's fundal height with a tape measure. It is important that the fundal height be measured and properly recorded to track proper fetal growth and the increasing development of amniotic fluid. The obstetrician, gynaecologist, or midwife should also routinely ultrasound the patient—this procedure will also give an indication of proper fetal growth and amniotic fluid development. Oligohydramnios can be caused by infection, kidney dysfunction or malformation (since much of the late amniotic fluid volume is urine), procedures such as chorionic villus sampling (CVS), and preterm premature rupture of membranes (PPROM). Oligohydramnios can sometimes be treated with bed rest, oral and intravenous hydration, antibiotics, steroids, and amnioinfusion.

The opposite of oligohydramnios is polyhydramnios, an excess volume of amniotic fluid in the amniotic sac. Too much amniotic fluid can compress nearby organs.

Amniotic fluid embolism is a rare but very often fatal condition for both mother and child.

=== Medical applications ===
It is being used in some surgeries of the outside of the eye. It is also being studied for some orthopaedic conditions.

=== Stem cell research ===
Recent studies show that amniotic fluid contains a considerable quantity of stem cells. These amniotic stem cells are pluripotent and able to differentiate into various tissues, which may be useful for future human application. Some researchers have found that amniotic fluid is also a plentiful source of non-embryonic stem cells. These cells have demonstrated the ability to differentiate into many different cell-types, including brain, liver and bone.

It is possible to conserve the stem cells extracted from amniotic fluid in private stem cell banks.

== See also ==
- Body fluid
- Biofluid dynamics
- Liquid breathing
- Potter's Syndrome
- Twin-twin transfusion syndrome
