= Prelabor rupture of membranes =

Breakage of the amniotic sac before the onset of labour

- Other names: Premature rupture of membranes
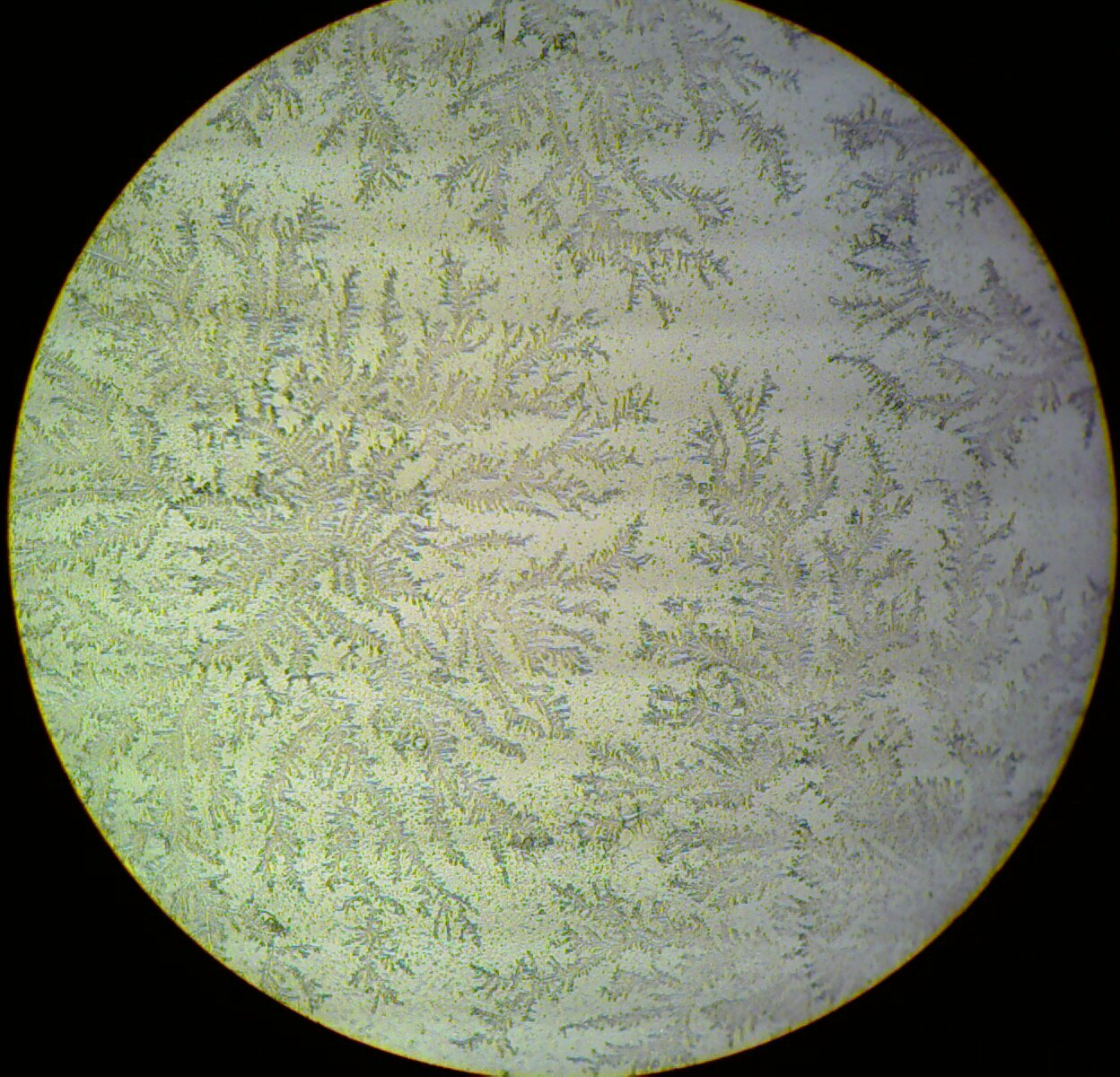
- Positive fern test with amniotic fluid as seen under the microscope
- Specialty: Obstetrics
- Symptoms: Painless gush or a steady leakage of fluid from the vagina
- Complications: Baby: Premature birth, cord compression, infection Mother: Placental abruption, postpartum endometritis
- Types: Term, preterm
- Risk factors: Infection of the amniotic fluid, prior PROM, bleeding in the later parts of pregnancy, smoking, a mother who is underweight
- Diagnostic method: Suspected based on symptoms and examination, supported by testing the fluid or ultrasound
- Differential diagnosis: Urinary incontinence, bacterial vaginosis
- Treatment: Based on how far along a woman is in pregnancy and whether complications are present
- Frequency: ~8% of term pregnancies, ~30% of preterm pregnancies

Prelabor rupture of membranes (PROM), previously known as premature rupture of membranes, is breakage of the amniotic sac before the onset of labour. Women usually experience a painless gush or a steady leakage of fluid from the vagina. Complications in the baby may include premature birth, cord compression, and infection. Complications in the mother may include placental abruption and postpartum endometritis.

Risk factors include infection of the amniotic fluid, prior PROM, bleeding in the later parts of pregnancy, smoking, and a mother who is underweight. Diagnosis is suspected based on symptoms and speculum exam and may be supported by testing the vaginal fluid or by ultrasound. If it occurs before 37 weeks it is known as PPROM (preterm prelabor rupture of membranes) otherwise it is known as term PROM.

Treatment is based on how far along a woman is in pregnancy and whether complications are present. In those at or near term without any complications, induction of labor is generally recommended. Time may also be provided for labor to begin spontaneously. In those 24 to 34 weeks of gestation without complications corticosteroids and close observation is recommended. A 2017 Cochrane review found waiting generally resulted in better outcomes in those before 37 weeks. Antibiotics may be given for those at risk of Group B streptococcus. Delivery is generally indicated in those with complications, regardless of how far along in pregnancy.

About 8% of term pregnancies are complicated by PROM while about 30% of preterm births are complicated by PROM. Before 24 weeks PROM occurs in fewer than 1% of pregnancies. Prognosis is primarily determined by complications related to prematurity such as necrotizing enterocolitis, intraventricular hemorrhage, and cerebral palsy.

== Signs and symptoms ==
Most women will experience a painless leakage of fluid out of the vagina. They may notice either a distinct "gush" or a steady flow of small amounts of watery fluid in the absence of steady uterine contractions. Loss of fluid may be associated with the baby becoming easier to feel through the belly (due to the loss of the surrounding fluid), decreased uterine size, or meconium (fetal stool) seen in the fluid.

== Risk factors ==
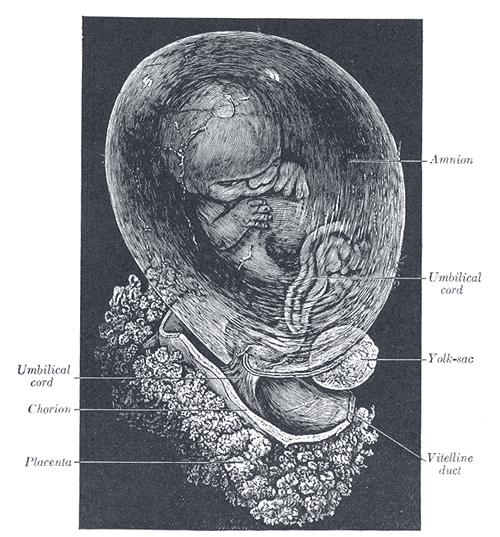
A fetus surrounded by the amniotic sac which is enclosed by fetal membranes. In PROM, these membranes rupture before labor starts.

The cause of PROM is not clearly understood, but the following are risk factors that increase the chance of it occurring. In many cases, however, no risk factor is identified.

- Infections: urinary tract infection, sexually transmitted diseases, lower genital tract infections (e.g. bacterial vaginosis), infections within the amniotic sac membranes (chorioamnionitis)
- Tobacco use during pregnancy
- Illicit drug use during pregnancy
- Having had PROM or preterm delivery in previous pregnancies
- Polyhydramnios: too much amniotic fluid
- Multiple gestation: being pregnant with two or more fetuses at one time
- Having had episodes of bleeding anytime during the pregnancy
- Invasive procedures (e.g. amniocentesis)
- Nutritional deficits
- Cervical insufficiency: having a short or prematurely dilated cervix during pregnancy
- Low socioeconomic status
- Being underweight

== Pathophysiology ==
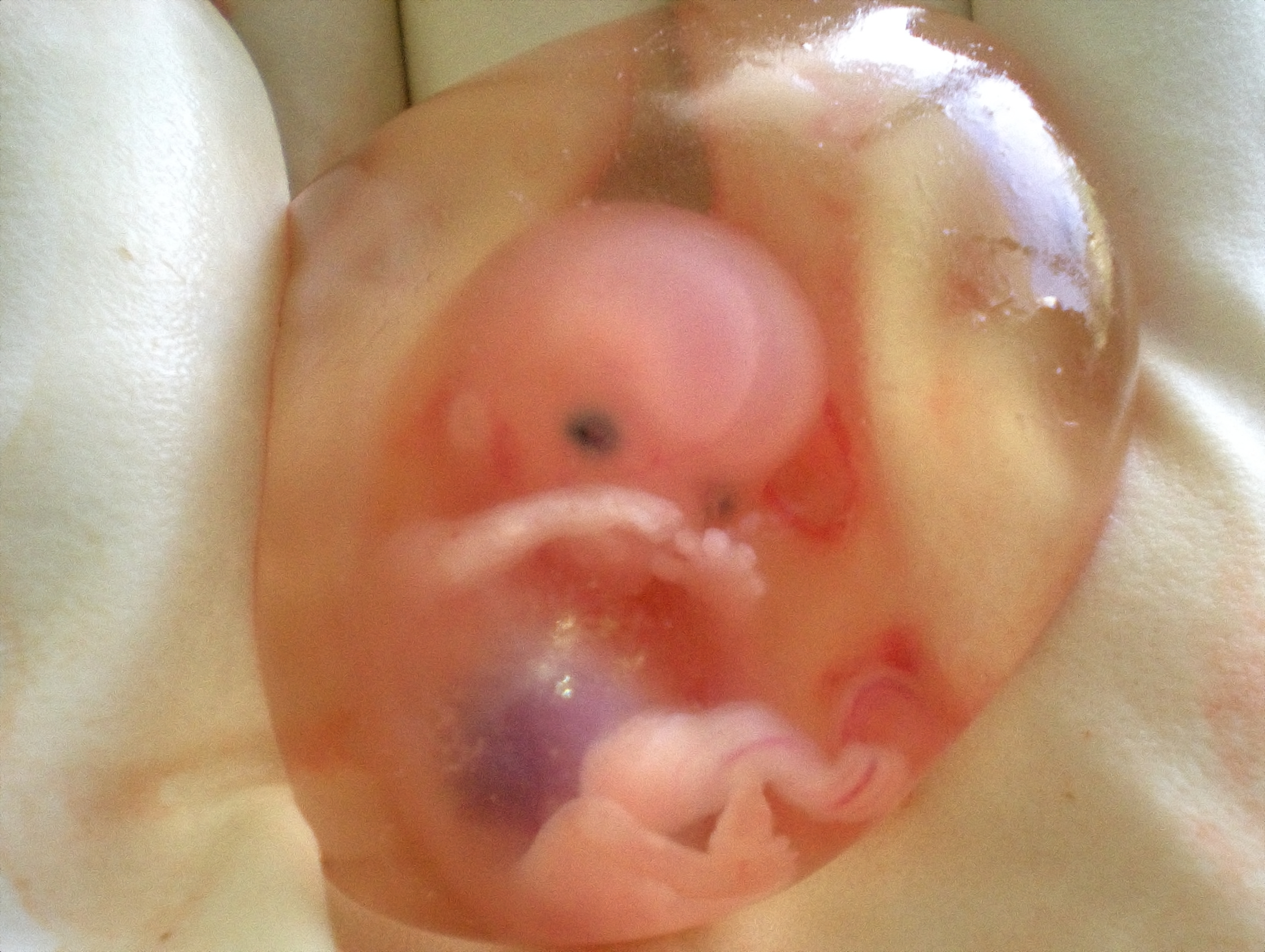
10-week-old human embryo surrounded by amniotic fluid and fetal membranes

=== Weak membranes ===
Fetal membranes likely break because they become weak and fragile. This weakening is a normal process that typically happens at term as the body prepares for labor and delivery. However, this can be a problem when it occurs before 37 weeks (preterm). The natural weakening of fetal membranes is thought to be due to one or a combination of the following. In PROM, these processes are activated too early:

- Cell death: when cells undergo programmed cell death, they release biochemical markers that are detected in higher concentrations in cases of PPROM.
- Poor assembly of collagen: collagen is a molecule that gives fetal membranes, as well as other parts of the human body such as the skin, their strength. In cases of PPROM, proteins that bind and cross-link collagen to increase its tensile strength are altered.
- Breakdown of collagen: collagen is broken down by enzymes called matrix metalloproteinases (MMPs), which are found at higher levels in PPROM amniotic fluid. This breakdown results in prostaglandin production which stimulates uterine contractions and cervical ripening. MMPs are inhibited by tissue inhibitors of matrix metalloproteinases (TIMPs) which are found at lower levels in PPROM amniotic fluid.

=== Infection ===
Infection and inflammation likely explains why membranes break earlier than they are supposed to. In studies, bacteria have been found in the amniotic fluid from about one-third of cases of PROM. Often, testing of the amniotic fluid is normal, but a subclinical infection (too small to detect) or infection of maternal tissues adjacent to the amniotic fluid, may still be a contributing factor. In response to infection, the resultant infection and release of chemicals (cytokines) subsequently weakens the fetal membranes and put them at risk for rupture. PROM is also a risk factor in the development of neonatal infections.

=== Genetics ===
Many genes play a role in inflammation and collagen production, therefore inherited genes may play a role in predisposing a person to PROM.

== Diagnosis ==
To confirm if a woman has experienced PROM, a clinician must prove that the fluid leaking from the vagina is amniotic fluid, and that labor has not yet started. To do this, a careful medical history is taken, a gynecological exam is conducted using a sterile speculum, and an ultrasound of the uterus is performed.

- History: a person with PROM typically recalls a sudden "gush" of fluid loss from the vagina, or steady loss of small amounts of fluid.
- Sterile speculum exam: a clinician will insert a sterile speculum into the vagina in order to see inside and perform the following evaluations. Digital cervical exams, in which gloved fingers are inserted into the vagina to measure the cervix, are avoided until the women is in active labor to reduce the risk of infection.
  - Pooling test: Pooling is when a collection of amniotic fluid can be seen in the back of the vagina (vaginal fornix). Sometimes leakage of fluid from the cervical opening can be seen when the person coughs or performs a valsalva maneuver.
  - Nitrazine test: A sterile cotton swab is used to collect fluid from the vagina and place it on nitrazine (phenaphthazine) paper. Amniotic fluid is mildly basic (pH 7.1–7.3) compared to normal vaginal secretions which are acidic (pH 4.5–6). Basic fluid, like amniotic fluid, will turn the nitrazine paper from orange to dark blue.
  - Fern test: A sterile cotton swab is used to collect fluid from the vagina and place it on a microscope slide. After drying, amniotic fluid will form a crystallization pattern called arborization which resembles leaves of a fern plant when viewed under a microscope.
  - Fibronectin and alpha-fetoprotein blood tests

=== Classification ===
- Prelabor rupture of membranes (PROM): when the fetal membranes rupture early, at least one hour before labor has started.
- Prolonged PROM: a case of prelabor rupture of membranes in which more than 18 hours has passed between the rupture and the onset of labor.
- Preterm prelabor rupture of membranes (PPROM): prelabor rupture of membranes that occurs before 37 weeks gestation.
- Midtrimester PPROM or pre-viable PPROM: prelabor rupture of membranes that occurs before 24 weeks' gestation. Before this age, the fetus cannot survive outside of the mother's womb.

=== Additional tests ===
The following tests should only be used if the diagnosis is still unclear after the standard tests above.

- Ultrasound: Ultrasound can measure the amount of fluid still in the uterus surrounding the fetus. If the fluid levels are low, PROM is more likely. This is helpful in cases when the diagnosis is not certain, but is not, by itself, definitive.
- Immune-chromatological tests are helpful, if negative, to rule out PROM, but are not that helpful if positive since the false-positive rate is relatively high (19–30%).
- Indigo carmine dye test: a needle is used to inject indigo carmine dye (blue) into the amniotic fluid that remains in the uterus through the abdominal wall. In the case of PROM, blue dye can be seen on a stained tampon or pad after about 15–30 minutes. This method can be used to definitively make a diagnosis, but is rarely done because it is invasive and increases risk of infection. But, can be helpful if the diagnosis is still unclear after the above evaluations have been done.

It is unclear if different methods of assessing the fetus in a woman with PPROM affects outcomes.

=== False positives ===
Like amniotic fluid, blood, semen, vaginal secretions in the presence of infection, soap, urine, and cervical mucus also have an alkaline pH and can also turn nitrazine paper blue. Cervical mucus can also make a pattern similar to ferning on a microscope slide, but it is usually patchy and with less branching.

=== Differential diagnosis ===
Other conditions that may present similarly to premature rupture of membranes are the following:

- Urinary incontinence: leakage of small amounts of urine is common in the last part of pregnancy
- Normal vaginal secretions of pregnancy
- Increased sweat or moisture around the perineum
- Increased cervical discharge: this can happen when there is a genital tract infection
- Semen
- Douching
- Vesicovaginal fistula: an abnormal connection between the bladder and the vagina
- Loss of the mucus plug

== Prevention ==
Women who have had PROM are more likely to experience it in future pregnancies. There is not enough data to recommend a way to specifically prevent future PROM. However, any woman that has had a history of preterm delivery, because of PROM or not, is recommended to take progesterone supplementation to prevent recurrence.

== Management ==
Summary	Fetal age	Management
Term	> 37 weeks	Induction of labor; Antibiotics if needed to prevent group B streptococcus (GBS) transmission
Late pre-term	34–36 weeks	Same as for term
Preterm	24–33 weeks	Watchful waiting (expectant management); Tocolytics to prevent the beginning of labor; Magnesium sulfate infusion for 24–48 hours to allow maximum efficacy of corticosteroids for fetal lungs and also confer benefit to fetal brain and gut before delivery; One time dose of corticosteroids (two separate administrations, 12–24 hours apart) before 34 weeks; Antibiotics if needed to prevent GBS transmission
Pre-viable	< 24 weeks	Discussion of watchful waiting or induction of labor; No antibiotics, corticosteroids, tocolysis, or magnesium sulfate

The management of PROM remains controversial, and depends largely on the gestational age of the fetus and other complicating factors. The risks of quick delivery (induction of labor) vs. watchful waiting in each case is carefully considered before deciding on a course of action.

As of 2012, the Royal College of Obstetricians and Gynaecologists advised, based on expert opinion and not clinical evidence, that attempted delivery during maternal instability increases the rates of both fetal death and maternal death, unless the source of instability is an intrauterine infection.

In all women with PROM, the age of the fetus, its position in the uterus, and its well-being should be evaluated. This can be done with ultrasound, Doppler fetal heart rate monitoring, and uterine activity monitoring. This will also show whether or not uterine contractions are happening which may be a sign that labor is starting. Signs and symptoms of infection should be closely monitored, and, if not already done, a group B streptococcus (GBS) culture should be collected.

At any age, if the fetal well-being appears to be compromised, or if intrauterine infection is suspected, the baby should be delivered quickly by induction of labour.

=== Term ===
Both expectant management (watchful waiting) and an induction of labor (artificially stimulating labor) are considered in this case. 90% of women start labor on their own within 24 hours, and therefore it is reasonable to wait for 12–24 hours as long as there is no risk of infection. However, if labor does not begin soon after the PROM, an induction of labor is recommended because it reduces rates of infections, decreases the chances that the baby will require a stay in the neonatal intensive care unit (NICU), and does not increase the rate of caesarean sections. If a woman strongly does not want to be induced, watchful waiting is an acceptable option as long as there is no sign of infection, the fetus is not in distress, and she is aware and accepts the risks of PPROM. There is not enough data to show that the use of prophylactic antibiotics (to prevent infection) is beneficial for mothers or babies at or near term because of the potential side effects and development of antibiotic resistance.

=== 34 to 37 weeks ===
When the fetus is 34 to 37 weeks gestation, the risk of being born prematurely must be weighed against the risk of PROM. Previously it was recommended that delivery be carried out as if the baby was term. A 2017 Cochrane review however found waiting resulted in better outcomes when pregnancy is before 37 weeks.

=== 24 to 34 weeks ===
Before 34 weeks, the fetus is at a much higher risk of the complications of prematurity. Therefore, as long as the fetus is doing well, and there are no signs of infection or placental abruption, watchful waiting (expectant management) is recommended. The younger the fetus, the longer it takes for labor to start on its own, but most women will deliver within a week. Waiting usually requires a woman to stay in the hospital so that health care providers can watch her carefully for infection, placental abruption, umbilical cord compression, or any other fetal emergency that would require quick delivery by induction of labor.

In 2017, a review of watchful waiting vs the early birth strategy was conducted to ascertain which was associated with a lower overall risk. Focusing on the 24–37-week range, the review analysed twelve randomised controlled trials from the "Cochrane Pregnancy and Childbirth's Trials Register", concluding that "In women with PPROM before 37 weeks' gestation with no contraindications to continuing the pregnancy, a policy of expectant management with careful monitoring was associated with better outcomes for the mother and baby."

There is believed to be a correlation between volume of amniotic fluid retained and neonatal outcomes before 26 weeks' gestation. Amniotic fluid levels are an important consideration when debating expectant management vs clinical intervention, as low levels, or oligohydramnios, can result in lung and limb abnormalities. Additionally, labor and infection are less likely to occur when there are sufficient levels of amniotic fluid remaining in the uterus. Serial amnioinfusion in pregnancies with PPROM-related oligohydramnios at less than 26 weeks gestation, successfully alleviates oligohydramnios, with perinatal outcomes that are significantly better than the outcome in those with the persistent condition and is comparable with gestations with PPROM in which oligohydramnios never develops.

==== Recommended ====
- Monitoring for infection: signs of infection include a fever in the mother, fetal tachycardia (fast heart rate of the fetus, more than 160 beats per minute), or tachycardia in the mother (more than 100 beats per minute). White blood cell (WBC) counts are not helpful in this case because WBC's are normally high in late pregnancy.
- Steroids before birth: corticosteroids (betamethasone) given to the mother of a baby at risk of being born prematurely can speed up fetal lung development and reduce the risk of death of the infant, respiratory distress syndrome, brain bleeds, and bowel necrosis. It is recommended that mothers receive one course of corticosteroids between 24 and 34 weeks when there is a risk of preterm delivery. In cases of PPROM these medications do not increase the risk of infection even though steroids are known to suppress the immune system. More than two courses is not recommended because three or more can lead to small birth weight and small head circumference. In pregnancies between 32 and 34 weeks (right around the time that fetal lungs mature) vaginal fluid can be tested to determine fetal lung maturity using chemical markers which can help to decide if corticosteroids should be given.
- Magnesium sulfate: Intravenous magnesium sulfate is given to the mother in cases when there is a risk of preterm birth before 32 weeks. This has been shown to protect the fetal brain and reduce the risk of cerebral palsy.
- Latency antibiotics: The time from PROM to labor is termed the latency period, and there is an inverse relationship between gestational age and the length of latency, meaning that the earlier the rupture, the longer it will take for labor to begin naturally. As expected, antibiotics given to mothers that experience PPROM serve to protect against infections during this lengthened latency period. Additionally, antibiotics increase the time that babies stay in the womb. Antibiotics don't seem to prevent death or make a difference in the long-term (years after the baby is born). But, because of the short-term benefits, routine use of antibiotics in PPROM is still recommended. The American Congress of Obstetricians and Gynecologists (ACOG) recommends a seven-day course of intravenous ampicillin and erythromycin followed by oral amoxicillin and erythromycin if watchful waiting is attempted before 34 weeks. Amoxicillin/clavulanic acid increases the risk of fetal bowel death (necrotizing enterocolitis) and should be avoided in pregnancy.
- Prophylactic antibiotics: If a woman is colonized with GBS, than the typical use of antibiotics during labor is recommended to prevent transmission of this bacteria to the fetus, regardless of earlier treatments.

==== Controversial or not recommended ====
- Preventative tocolysis (medications to prevent contractions): the use of tocolytic medications to prevent labor contractions is controversial. On the one hand, this can delay delivery and allow the fetus more time to develop and benefit from antenatal corticosteroid medication, on the other hand it increases the risk of infection or chorioamnionitis. The use of tocolysis has not shown to benefit mom or baby and currently there is not enough data to recommend or discourage its use in the case of preterm PROM.
- Therapeutic tocolysis (medications to stop contractions): Once labor has started, using tocolysis to stop labor has not been shown to help, and is not recommended.
- Amnioinfusion: This treatment attempts to replace the lost amniotic fluid from the uterus by infusing normal saline fluid into the uterine cavity. This can be done through the vagina and cervix (transcervical amnioinfusion) or by passing a needle through the abdominal wall (transabdominal amnioinfusion). Current data suggests that this treatment prevents infection, lung problems, and fetal death. However, there have not been enough trials to recommend its routine use in all cases of PPROM.
- Home care: Typically women with PPROM are managed in the hospital, but, occasionally they opt to go home if watchful waiting is attempted. Since labor usually starts soon after PPROM, and infection, umbilical cord compression, and other fetal emergencies can happen very suddenly, it is recommended that women stay in the hospital in cases of PPROM after 24 weeks. Currently, there is not enough evidence to determine meaningful differences in safety, cost, and women's views between management at home vs. the hospital.
- Sealing membranes after rupture: Infection is the major risk associated with PROM and PPROM. By closing the ruptured membranes, it is hoped that there would be a decrease in infection, as well as encouraging the re-accumulation of amniotic fluid in the uterus to protect the fetus and allow for further lung development. Common techniques include placing a sponge over the ruptured membrane and the use of oral autoimmune stimulating drugs to encourage the body's immune system to repair the rupture. There is currently insufficient research to determine whether these or other resealing techniques improve maternal or neonatal outcomes when compared to the current standard of care.

=== Before 24 weeks ===
Before 24 weeks, a fetus is not viable meaning it cannot live outside the mother. In this case, either watchful waiting at home or an induction of labor done.

Because the risk of infection is so high, the mother should check her temperature often and return to the hospital if she develops any signs or symptoms of infection, labor, or vaginal bleeding. These women are typically admitted to the hospital once their fetus reaches 24 weeks and then managed the same as women with PPROM before 34 weeks (discussed above). When possible, these deliveries should take place in a hospital that has expertise in the management of the potential maternal and neonatal complications, and has the necessary infrastructure in place to support the care of these patients (i.e. neonatal intensive care unit). Antenatal corticosteroids, latency antibiotics, magnesium sulfate, and tocolytic medications are not recommended until the fetus reaches viability (24 weeks). In cases of pre-viable PPROM, chance of survival of the fetus is between 15 and 50%, and the risk of chorioamnionitis is about 30%.

=== Chorioamnionitis ===
Chorioamnionitis is a bacterial infection of the fetal membranes, which can be life-threatening to both mother and fetus. Women with PROM at any age are at high risk of infection because the membranes are open and allow bacteria to enter. Women are checked often (usually every 4 hours) for signs of infection: fever (more than 38 °C or 100.5 °F), uterine pain, maternal tachycardia, fetal tachycardia, or foul-smelling amniotic fluid. Elevated white blood cells are not a good way to predict infection because they are normally high in labor. If infection is suspected, artificial induction of labor is started at any gestational age and broad antibiotics are given. Caesarean section should not be automatically done in cases of infection, and should only be reserved for the usual fetal emergencies.

== Outcomes ==
The consequences of PROM depend on the gestational age of the fetus. When PROM occurs at term (after 36 weeks), it is typically followed soon thereafter by the start of labor and delivery. About half of women will give birth within 5 hours, and 95% will give birth within 28 hours without any intervention. The younger the baby, the longer the latency period (time between membrane rupture and start of labor). Rarely, in cases of preterm PROM, amniotic fluid will stop leaking and the amniotic fluid volume will return to normal.

If PROM occurs before 37 weeks, it is called preterm prelabor rupture of membranes (PPROM), and the baby and mother are at greater risk of complications. PPROM causes one-third of all preterm births. PROM provides a path for disease-causing organisms to enter the womb and puts both the mother and baby at risk for infection. Low levels of fluid around the baby also increase the risk of umbilical cord compression and can interfere with lung and body formation of the baby in early pregnancy.

=== Infection (any age) ===
At any gestational age, an opening in the fetal membranes provides a route for bacteria to enter the womb. This can lead to chorioamnionitis (an infection of the fetal membranes and amniotic fluid) which can be life-threatening to both the mother and fetus. The risk of infection increases the longer the membranes remain open and baby undelivered. Women with preterm PROM will develop an intra-amniotic infection 15–25% of the time, and the chances of infection increase at earlier gestational ages.

=== Pre-term birth (before 37 weeks) ===
PROM occurring before 37 weeks (PPROM) is one of the leading causes of preterm birth. Thirty to 35% of all preterm births are caused by PPROM. This puts the fetus at risk for the many complications associated with prematurity such as respiratory distress, brain bleeds, infection, necrotizing enterocolitis (death of the fetal bowels), brain injury, muscle dysfunction, and death. Prematurity from any cause leads to 75% of perinatal mortality and about 50% of all long-term morbidity. PROM is responsible for 20% of all fetal deaths between 24 and 34 weeks' gestation.

=== Fetal development (before 24 weeks) ===
Before 24 weeks the fetus is still developing its organs, and the amniotic fluid is important for protecting the fetus against infection, physical impact, and for preventing the umbilical cord from becoming compressed. It also allows for fetal movement and breathing that is necessary for the development of the lungs, chest, and bones. Low levels of amniotic fluid due to mid-trimester or previable PPROM (before 24 weeks) can result in fetal deformity (e.g. Potter-like facies), limb contractures, pulmonary hypoplasia (underdeveloped lungs), infection (especially if the mother is colonized by group B streptococcus or bacterial vaginosis), prolapsed umbilical cord or compression, and placental abruption.

=== PROM after second-trimester amniocentesis ===
Most cases of PROM occur spontaneously, but the risk of PROM in women undergoing a second trimester amniocentesis for prenatal diagnosis of genetic disorders is 1%. Although no studies are known to account for all cases of PROM that stem from amniocentesis. This case, the chances of the membranes healing on their own and the amniotic fluid returning to normal levels is much higher than spontaneous PROM. Compared to spontaneous PROM, about 70% of women will have normal amniotic fluid levels within one month, and about 90% of babies will survive.

== Epidemiology ==
Of term pregnancies (more than 37 weeks) about 8% are complicated by PROM, 20% of these become prolonged PROM. About 30% of all preterm deliveries (before 37 weeks) are complicated by PPROM, and rupture of membranes before viability (before 24 weeks) occurs in less than 1% of all pregnancies. Since there are significantly fewer preterm deliveries than term deliveries, the number of PPROM cases make up only about 5% of all cases of PROM.

== See also ==
- Placental alpha microglobulin-1 (PAMG-1)
- IGFBP1 (Insulin-like growth factor binding protein-1)
