= Antenatal steroid =

- Other names: Antenatal corticosteroids
- Specialty: Ob/gyn

Antenatal steroids, also known as antenatal corticosteroids, are medications administered to pregnant women expecting a preterm birth. When administered, these steroids accelerate the maturation of the fetus' lungs, which reduces the likelihood of infant respiratory distress syndrome and infant mortality. The effectiveness of this corticosteroid treatment on humans was first demonstrated in 1972 by Sir Graham Liggins and Ross Howie, during a randomized control trial using betamethasone.

== Uses ==
=== Preterm birth ===
Antenatal steroids have been shown to reduce the occurrence and mortality of infant respiratory distress syndrome, a life-threatening condition caused by underdeveloped lungs.

Current evidence suggests that giving antenatal corticosteroids reduces risk of late miscarriages and baby deaths. The baby is also less likely to develop respiratory distress syndrome or die during or after birth. They are also less likely to have intraventricular hemorrhage (bleeding of the brain), necrotizing enterocolitis (problems with the bowels), or systemic infections (infections affecting the whole body) in the first two days of life.

Steroids do not appear to increase the number of women who develop infection of the fetal membranes (chorioamnionitis) or of the womb (endometritis).

There is robust evidence that a single course of antenatal corticosteroids (i.e., 24 mg of betamethasone or dexamethasone), when there is a risk of preterm birth (at less than 34 weeks of gestation), reduces the risk of child death, regardless of resource level.

==== Multiple gestation ====
Further research must be conducted to adequately determine outcomes of antenatal steroid administration for multiple pregnancies. However, clinical practice guidelines recommend the usage of steroids for preterm birth regardless of multiple gestation.

=== Preterm premature rupture of membranes ===
Antenatal steroids have also been shown to have definite beneficial effect in treating the condition of preterm premature rupture of membranes (PPROM). Similar to its effects on preterm birth, research evidence suggests that the administration of antenatal steroids to patients with PPROM reduces risks of neonatal mortality, intraventricular hemorrhage and respiratory distress syndrome.

== Adverse effects ==
Preliminary research has suggested that the use of antenatal corticosteroids may have adverse long-term effects. In animals, antenatal corticosteroid use has been associated with adverse effects on the cardiometabolic system and inhibited growth of the brain, as well as worsened memory and learning difficulties. While it is not yet certain if human fetuses would experience these same effects, some literature has found that human preterm fetuses treated with antenatal corticosteroids may be at greater risk of developing mental and behavioural disorders during childhood, as these drugs are able to enter the fetus' brain and could affect neurodevelopment. In both humans and animals, research has suggested that repeated doses of antenatal corticosteroids could lead to an increased risk of vision and hearing issues in the long-term.

=== Contraindications ===
Contraindications to the administration of antenatal corticosteroids include:

- Systemic maternal infection
- Maternal chorioamnionitis

== Drugs ==
Corticosteroids encourage the development of the lungs in a premature fetus before birth, and are administered when the premature fetus is expected to be delivered within 24 to 48 hours. The period of optimal benefit begins 24 hours after administration and lasts 7 days. In some parts of the world, antenatal steroids are used at up to 36 weeks of pregnancy. The time between administration of steroids and delivery may alter the effectiveness of the steroids.

National Guidelines Published in English on Antenatal Steroid Administration for Preterm Birth
Country	Organization (Year of Publication)	Gestational Age Recommendations	Other Inclusion Criteria	Betamethasone or Dexamethasone
Australia & New Zealand	Australian & New Zealand Neonatal Network (2018)	< 34 weeks and 6 days	Preterm birth anticipated in 1 – 8 days	Not specified
Australia & New Zealand	Antenatal Corticosteroids Clinical Practice Guidelines Panel (2015)	≤ 34 weeks and 6 days	Preterm birth anticipated in ≥7 days	Either Betamethasone or Dexamethasone
Australia & New Zealand	Society of Obstetric Medicine of Australia and New Zealand (2014)	< 34 weeks	-	Not specified
Canada	Society of Obstetricians & Gynaecologists of Canada (2018)	24 – 34 weeks and 6 days	Preterm birth anticipated in ≥7 days	Either Betamethasone or Dexamethasone
United Kingdom	Royal College of Obstetricians and Gynaecologists (2015)	24 – 33 weeks and 6 days	Anticipated preterm birth	Not specified
United States of America	The American College of Obstetricians and Gynecologists (2020)	24 – 33 weeks and 6 days	Preterm birth anticipated within 7 days	Betamethasone
International	World Health Organization (2015)	24 – 34 weeks	Gestational age can be accurately assessed, preterm birth anticipated within 7 days, lack of maternal infection	Either Betamethasone or Dexamethasone

=== Choice of steroid ===
Common corticosteroids include dexamethasone and betamethasone. Dexamethasone is often recommended over the latter due to its increased efficacy and safety, wide availability, and low cost, while betamethasone is better at preventing the softening of the brain in premature fetuses. Both drugs share certain commonalities, including the ability to traverse the placenta, as well as a very similar molecular structure. In fact, the two steroids are identical save for a single additional methyl group on betamethasone. Although betamethasone has an increased half-life, there is no significant evidence indicating that one might be better than the other. Literature on the subject is limited and inconsistent. A Cochrane review (2022) found that it was unclear if there were significant differences, while other studies determined that betamethasone results in improved longer term outcomes.

=== Mechanism of action ===
In order to generate improved respiratory outcomes, antenatal steroids act on cells called type II pneumocytes which are located within the alveoli of infant lungs. Glucocorticoids both increase rates of cell maturation, as well as increase the production of mRNA coding for proteins required for the synthesis of surfactant. Surfactant is a phospholipid-rich substance secreted by the lungs in order to increase elasticity and decrease surface tension, consequently generating more efficient rates of ventilation. Additionally, surfactant lines the insides of alveoli in the lungs and as a result, prevents alveoli from collapsing during exhalation. Since infants born preterm often have immature or incompletely developed lungs, the surfactant coating of the alveoli is similarly insufficient, resulting in poor respiratory outcomes or the development of respiratory distress syndrome. The administration of antenatal corticosteroids increases production of surfactant (decreasing the need to use surfactant after birth), and therefore result in better health outcomes for preterm infants.

== History ==
In 1969, Graham Liggins, a medical research scientist, began investigating the effects of dexamethasone administration on the timing of labor in pregnant sheep. Liggins conducted this experiment in the hopes of proving his hypothesis that the fetus, and not the mother, is responsible for inducing labour. Liggins found that dexamethasone caused pregnant sheep to deliver their fetuses prematurely, however, despite the fact that the lamb fetus was extremely premature, it was delivered alive.

With the help of his colleague, pediatrician Ross Howie, Liggins conducted a similar experiment with 282 human women, all of whom were projected to have a preterm delivery. This preliminary trial showed that the administration of corticosteroids, specifically betamethasone, resulted in immediate improvements that were statistically significant, such as:

- Lowered neonatal mortality rate
- Reduced incidence of respiratory distress syndrome, but only in fetuses who had
  1. Undergone less than 32 weeks of gestation, and;
  2. Were treated for a minimum 24 hours before they were delivered
- Reduced incidence of intraventricular cerebral hemorrhage

These findings were first reported in the article A Controlled Trial of Antepartum Glucocorticoid Treatment for Prevention of the Respiratory Distress Syndrome in Premature Infants, published in the journal Pediatrics in 1972. Liggins and Howie's research proved that antenatal corticosteroids were able to decrease respiratory complications and infant mortality by inducing cellular differentiation, and thus maturation, in the lungs. However, these results were not incorporated into clinical practice in the United States until over two decades later.
