= Preterm birth =

Birth at less than a specified gestational age

- Other names: Premature birth, preemies, premmies
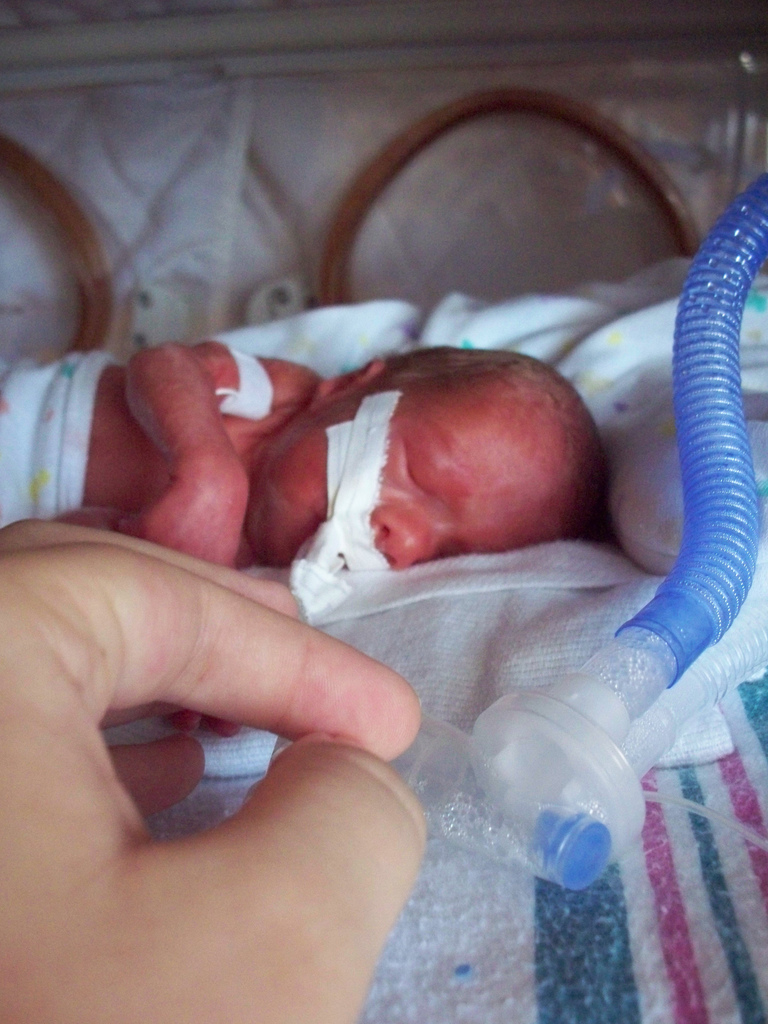
- Intubated preterm baby in an incubator
- Specialty: Neonatology, Pediatrics, Obstetrics
- Symptoms: Birth of a baby at younger than 37 weeks' gestational age
- Complications: Cerebral palsy, delays in development, hearing problems, sight problems
- Causes: Often unknown
- Risk factors: Diabetes, high blood pressure, Multiple gestation, obesity or underweight, a number of vaginal infections, celiac disease, tobacco smoking, psychological stress
- Prevention: Progesterone
- Treatment: Corticosteroids, keeping the baby warm through skin-to-skin contact, supporting breastfeeding, treating infections, supporting breathing
- Frequency: ~15 million a year (12% of deliveries)
- Deaths: 805,800

Preterm birth, also known as premature birth, is the birth of a baby at fewer than 37 weeks gestational age, as opposed to full-term delivery at approximately 40 weeks. Extreme preterm is less than 28 weeks, very early preterm birth is between 28 and 32 weeks, early preterm birth occurs between 32 and 34 weeks, and late preterm birth is between 34 and 36 weeks' gestation. These babies are also known as premature babies or colloquially preemies (American English) or premmies (Australian English). Symptoms of preterm labor include uterine contractions which occur more often than every ten minutes and/or the leaking of fluid from the vagina before 37 weeks. Premature infants are at greater risk for cerebral palsy, delays in development, hearing problems and problems with their vision. The earlier a baby is born, the greater these risks will be.

The cause of spontaneous preterm birth is often not known. Risk factors include diabetes, high blood pressure, multiple gestation (being pregnant with more than one baby), being either obese or underweight, vaginal infections, air pollution exposure, tobacco smoking, and psychological stress. For a healthy pregnancy, medical induction of labor or cesarean section are not recommended before 39 weeks unless required for other medical reasons. There may be certain medical reasons for early delivery, such as preeclampsia.

Preterm birth may be prevented in those at risk if the hormone progesterone is taken during pregnancy. Evidence does not support the usefulness of bed rest to prevent preterm labor. Of the approximately 900,000 preterm deaths globally in 2019, it is estimated that at least 75% of these preterm infants would have survived with appropriate cost-effective treatment, and the survival rate is highest among the infants born the latest in gestation. In women who might deliver between 24 and 37 weeks, corticosteroid treatment may improve outcomes. A number of medications, including nifedipine, may delay delivery so that a mother can be moved to where more medical care is available and the corticosteroids have a greater chance to work. Once the baby is born, care includes keeping the baby warm through skin-to-skin contact or incubation, supporting breastfeeding and/or formula feeding, treating infections, and supporting breathing. Preterm babies sometimes require intubation.

Preterm birth is the most common cause of death among infants worldwide. About 15 million babies are preterm each year (5% to 18% of all deliveries). Late preterm birth accounts for 75% of all preterm births. This rate is inconsistent across countries. In the United Kingdom, 7.9% of babies are born pre-term, and in the United States, 12.3% of all births are before 37 weeks of gestation. Approximately 0.5% of births are extremely early periviable births (20–25 weeks of gestation), and these account for most of the deaths. In many countries, rates of premature births have increased between the 1990s and 2010s. Complications from preterm births resulted globally in 0.81 million deaths in 2015, down from 1.57 million in 1990. The chance of survival at 22 weeks is about 6%, while at 23 weeks it is 26%, 24 weeks 55% and 25 weeks about 72%. The chances of survival without any long-term difficulties are lower.

== Signs and symptoms ==
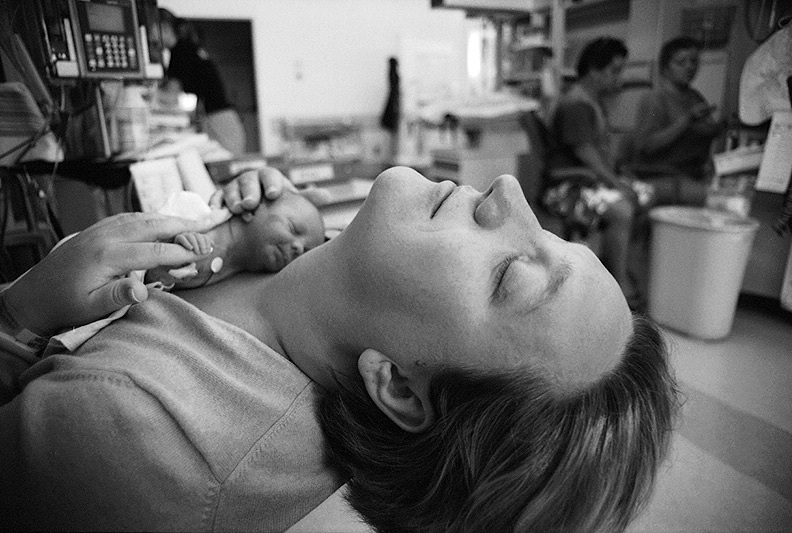
A new mother holds her premature baby at Kapiolani Medical Center NICU in Honolulu, Hawaii.

Signs and symptoms of preterm labor include four or more uterine contractions in one hour. In contrast to false labour, true labour is accompanied by cervical dilation and effacement. Also, vaginal bleeding in the third trimester, heavy pressure in the pelvis, or abdominal or back pain could be indicators that a preterm birth is about to occur. A watery discharge from the vagina may indicate premature rupture of the membranes that surround the baby. While the rupture of the membranes may not be followed by labor, usually delivery is indicated as infection (chorioamnionitis) is a serious threat to both fetus and mother. In some cases, the cervix dilates prematurely without pain or perceived contractions, so that the mother may not have warning signs until very late in the birthing process.

== Causes ==
Preterm labor can be caused by medical conditions, including infections, environmental or drug exposures, cervical insufficiency, uterine abnormalities, or amniotic fluid problems. Some women require preterm labor induction for medical conditions. Other preterm births are spontaneous. In some cases, preterm labor occurs spontaneously, and there is no identifiable cause. There are maternal and pregnancy-related risk factors that increase the risk of a woman experiencing preterm labor.

=== Risk factors of preterm labor ===
The exact cause of spontaneous preterm birth is difficult to determine and it may be caused by many different factors at the same time as labor is a complex process. The research available is limited about the cervix and therefore, is limited in discerning what is or is not normal. Four different pathways have been identified that can result in preterm birth and have considerable evidence: precocious fetal endocrine activation, uterine overdistension (placental abruption), decidual bleeding, and intrauterine inflammation or infection.

Identifying women at high risk of giving birth early would enable the health services to provide specialized care for these women and their babies, for example, a hospital with a special care baby unit, such as a neonatal intensive care unit (NICU). In some instances, it may be possible to delay the birth. Risk scoring systems have been suggested as an approach to identify those at higher risk; however, there is no strong research in this area, so it is unclear whether the use of risk scoring systems for identifying mothers would prolong pregnancy and reduce the number of preterm births or not.

==== Maternal factors ====
Risk factor	Relative risk	95% confidence interval
Fetal fibronectin	4.0	2.9–5.5
Short cervical length	2.9	2.1–3.9
Prenatal Care Absent	2.9	2.8–3.0
Chlamydia	2.2	1.0–4.8
Low socio-economic status	1.9	1.7–2.2
Large or small pregnancy weight gain	1.8	1.5–2.3
Short maternal height	1.8	1.3–2.5
Periodontitis	1.6	1.1–2.3
Celiac disease	1.4	1.2–1.6
Asymptomatic bacteriuria	1.1	0.8–1.5
High or low BMI	0.96	0.66–1.4
	Odds ratio	
History of spontaneous preterm birth	3.6	3.2–4.0
Bacterial vaginosis	2.2	1.5–3.1
Black ethnicity/race	2.0	1.8–2.2
Filipino ancestry	1.7	1.5–2.1
Unwanted pregnancy	1.5	1.41–1.61
Unintended pregnancy	1.31	1.09–1.58
Being single/unmarried	1.2	1.03–1.28

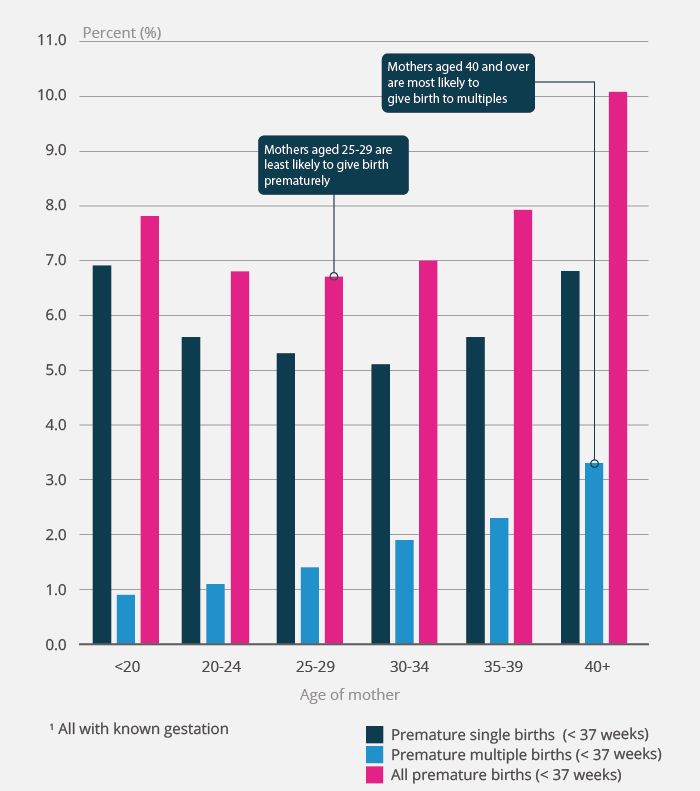
Percentage premature births in England and Wales 2011, by age of mother and whether single or multiple birth

Risk factors in the mother have been identified that are linked to a higher risk of a preterm birth. These include age (either very young or older), high or low body mass index (BMI), length of time between pregnancies, endometriosis, previous spontaneous (i.e., miscarriage) or surgical abortions, unintended pregnancies, untreated or undiagnosed celiac disease, fertility difficulties, heat exposure, and genetic variables.

Studies on the type of work and physical activity have given conflicting results, but it is opined that stressful conditions, hard labor, and long hours are probably linked to preterm birth. Obesity does not directly lead to preterm birth; however, it is associated with diabetes and hypertension, which are risk factors by themselves. To some degree, those individuals may have underlying conditions (i.e., uterine malformation, hypertension, diabetes) that persist. Couples who have tried more than one year versus those who have tried less than one year before achieving a spontaneous conception have an adjusted odds ratio of 1.35 (95% confidence interval 1.22–1.50) of preterm birth. Pregnancies after IVF confers a greater risk of preterm birth than spontaneous conceptions after more than one year of trying, with an adjusted odds ratio of 1.55 (95% CI 1.30–1.85).

Certain ethnicities may have a higher risk as well. For example, in the U.S. and the UK, Black women have preterm birth rates of 15–18%, more than double that of the white population. Many Black women have higher preterm birth rates due to multiple factors, but the most common is high amounts of chronic stress, which can eventually lead to premature birth. Adult chronic disease is not always the case with premature birth in Black women, which makes the main factor of premature birth challenging to identify. Filipinos are also at high risk of premature birth, and it is believed that nearly 11–15% of Filipinos born in the U.S. (compared to other Asians at 7.6% and whites at 7.8%) are premature. Filipinos being a big risk factor is evidenced with the Philippines being the eighth-highest ranking in the world for preterm births, the only non-African country in the top 10. This discrepancy is not seen in comparison to other Asian groups or Hispanic immigrants and remains unexplained. Genetic make-up is a factor in the causality of preterm birth. Genetics has been a big factor in why Filipinos have a high risk of premature birth, as Filipinos have a large prevalence of mutations that predispose them to premature births. An intra- and transgenerational increase in the risk of preterm delivery has been demonstrated. No single gene has been identified.

Marital status has long been associated with risks for preterm birth. A 2005 study of 25,373 pregnancies in Finland revealed that unmarried mothers had more preterm deliveries than married mothers (P=0.001). Pregnancy outside of marriage was associated overall with a 20% increase in total adverse outcomes, even at a time when Finland provided free maternity care. A study in Quebec of 720,586 births from 1990 to 1997 revealed less risk of preterm birth for infants with legally married mothers compared with those with common-law wed or unwed parents. A study conducted in Malaysia in 2015 showed a similar trend, with marital status being significantly associated with preterm birth. However, the result of a study conducted in the US showed that between 1989 and 2006, marriage became less protective of preterm births which was attributed to the changing social norms and behaviors surrounding marriage.

==== Factors during pregnancy ====
Medications during pregnancy, living conditions, air pollution, smoking, illicit drugs or alcohol, infection, or physical trauma may also cause a preterm birth.

Air pollution: Living in an area with a high concentration of air pollution is a major risk factor for preterm labor, including living near major roadways or highways where vehicle emissions are high from traffic congestion or are a route for diesel trucks that tend to emit more pollution.

The use of fertility medication that stimulates the ovary to release multiple eggs and of IVF with embryo transfer of multiple embryos has been implicated as a risk factor for preterm birth. Often labor has to be induced for medical reasons; such conditions include high blood pressure, pre-eclampsia, maternal diabetes, asthma, thyroid disease, and heart disease.

Certain medical conditions in the pregnant mother may also increase the risk of preterm birth. Some women have anatomical problems that prevent the baby from being carried to term. These include a weak or short cervix (the strongest predictor of premature birth). Women with vaginal bleeding during pregnancy are at higher risk for preterm birth. While bleeding in the third trimester may be a sign of placenta previa or placental abruption—conditions that occur frequently preterm—even earlier bleeding that is not caused by these conditions is linked to a higher preterm birth rate. Women with abnormal amounts of amniotic fluid, whether too much (polyhydramnios) or too little (oligohydramnios), are also at risk. Anxiety and depression have been linked as risk factors for preterm birth.

The use of tobacco, cocaine, and excessive alcohol during pregnancy increases the chance of preterm delivery. Tobacco is the most commonly used drug during pregnancy and contributes significantly to low birth weight delivery. Babies with birth defects are at higher risk of being born preterm.

Passive smoking and/or smoking before the pregnancy influences the probability of a preterm birth. The World Health Organization published an international study in March 2014.

Presence of anti-thyroid antibodies is associated with an increased risk of preterm birth with an odds ratio of 1.9 and 95% confidence interval of 1.1–3.5.

Intimate violence against the mother is another risk factor for preterm birth.

Physical trauma may cause a preterm birth. The Nigerian cultural method of abdominal massage has been shown to result in 19% preterm birth among women in Nigeria, plus many other adverse outcomes for the mother and baby. This ought not be confused with massage therapy conducted by a fully trained and certified/licensed massage therapist or by significant others trained to provide massage during pregnancy, which—in a study involving pregnant females with prenatal depression—has been shown to have numerous positive results during pregnancy, including the reduction of preterm birth, less depression, lower cortisol, and reduced anxiety. In healthy women, however, no effects have been demonstrated in a controlled study.

==== Infection ====
The frequency of infection in preterm birth is inversely related to the gestational age. Mycoplasma genitalium infection is associated with increased risk of preterm birth and spontaneous abortion.

Infectious microorganisms can be ascending, hematogenous, iatrogenic by a procedure, or retrograde through the fallopian tubes. From the decidua, they may reach the space between the amnion and chorion, the amniotic fluid, and the fetus. A chorioamnionitis also may lead to sepsis of the mother. Fetal infection is linked to preterm birth and to significant long-term disability, including cerebral palsy.

It has been reported that asymptomatic colonization of the decidua occurs in up to 70% of women at term using a DNA probe, suggesting that the presence of micro-organism alone may be insufficient to initiate the infectious response.

As the condition is more prevalent in black women in the U.S. and the UK, it has been suggested as an explanation for the higher rate of preterm birth in these populations. It is opined that bacterial vaginosis before or during pregnancy may affect the decidual inflammatory response that leads to preterm birth. The condition known as aerobic vaginitis can be a serious risk factor for preterm labor; several previous studies failed to acknowledge the difference between aerobic vaginitis and bacterial vaginosis, which may explain some of the contradictions in the results.

Untreated yeast infections are associated with preterm birth.

A review into prophylactic antibiotics (given to prevent infection) in the second and third trimester of pregnancy (13–42 weeks of pregnancy) found a reduction in the number of preterm births in women with bacterial vaginosis. These antibiotics also reduced the number of waters breaking before labor in full-term pregnancies, reduced the risk of infection of the lining of the womb after delivery (endometritis), and reduced the risk of gonococcal infection. However, the women without bacterial vaginosis did not have any reduction in preterm births or pre-labor preterm waters breaking. Much of the research included in this review lost participants during follow-up, so they did not report the long-term effects of the antibiotics on mothers or babies. More research in this area is needed to find the full effects of giving antibiotics throughout the second and third trimesters of pregnancy.

Several maternal bacterial infections are associated with preterm birth, including pyelonephritis, asymptomatic bacteriuria, pneumonia, and appendicitis. A review into giving antibiotics in pregnancy for asymptomatic bacteriuria (urine infection with no symptoms) found the research was of very low quality, but it did suggest that taking antibiotics reduced the number of preterm births and babies with low birth weight. Another review found that one dose of antibiotics did not seem as effective as a course of antibiotics, but fewer women reported side effects from one dose. This review recommended that more research is needed to discover the best way of treating asymptomatic bacteriuria.

A different review found that preterm births happened less for pregnant women who had routine testing for low genital tract infections than for women who only had testing when they showed symptoms of low genital tract infections. The women being routinely tested also gave birth to fewer babies with low birth weight. Even though these results look promising, the review was only based on one study, so more research is needed into routine screening for low genital tract infections.

Also, periodontal disease has been shown repeatedly to be linked to preterm birth. In contrast, viral infections, unless accompanied by a significant febrile response, are considered not to be a major factor in relation to preterm birth.

==== Genetics ====
There is believed to be a maternal genetic component in preterm birth. Estimated heritability of timing-of-birth in women was 34%. However, the occurrence of preterm birth in families does not follow a clear inheritance pattern, thus supporting the idea that preterm birth is a non-Mendelian trait with a polygenic nature.

==== Prenatal care ====
The absence of prenatal care has been associated with higher rates of preterm births. Analysis of 15,627,407 live births in the United States in 1995–1998 concluded that the absence of prenatal care carried a 2.9 (95%CI 2.8, 3.0) times higher risk of preterm births. This same study found statistically significant relative risks of maternal anemia, intrapartum fever, unknown bleeding, renal disease, placental previa, hydramnios, placenta abruption, and pregnancy-induced hypertension with the absence of prenatal care. All these prenatal risks were controlled for other high-risk conditions, maternal age, gravidity, marital status, and maternal education. The absence of prenatal care before and during the pregnancy is primarily a function of socioeconomic factors (low family income and education), access to medical consultations (large distance from the place of residence to the healthcare unit and transportation costs), quality of healthcare, and social support. Efforts to decrease rates of preterm birth should aim to increase the deficits posed by the aforementioned barriers and to increase access to prenatal care.

== Diagnosis ==
=== Placental alpha microglobulin-1 ===
Placental alpha microglobulin-1 (PAMG-1) has been the subject of several investigations evaluating its ability to predict imminent spontaneous preterm birth in women with signs, symptoms, or complaints suggestive of preterm labor. In one investigation comparing this test to fetal fibronectin testing and cervical length measurement via transvaginal ultrasound, the test for PAMG-1 (commercially known as the PartoSure test) has been reported to be the single best predictor of imminent spontaneous delivery within 7 days of a patient presenting with signs, symptoms, or complaints of preterm labor. Specifically, the PPV, or positive predictive value, of the tests were 76%, 29%, and 30% for PAMG-1, fFN, and CL, respectively (P < 0.01).

=== Fetal fibronectin ===
Fetal fibronectin (fFN) has become an important biomarker—the presence of this glycoprotein in the cervical or vaginal secretions indicates that the border between the chorion and decidua has been disrupted. A positive test indicates an increased risk of preterm birth, and a negative test has a high predictive value. It has been shown that only 1% of women in questionable cases of preterm labor delivered within the next week when the test was negative.

=== Ultrasound ===
Obstetric ultrasound has become useful in the assessment of the cervix in women at risk for premature delivery. A short cervix preterm is undesirable: A cervical length of less than 25 mm (0.98 in) at or before 24 weeks of gestational age is the most common definition of cervical incompetence.

=== Emerging technologies ===
Technologies under research and development to facilitate earlier diagnosis of preterm births include sanitary pads that identify biomarkers such as fFN and PAMG-1 in vaginal secretions. These devices then calculate a risk of preterm birth and send the findings to a smartphone. The notion that risk-scoring systems are accurate in predicting preterm birth has been debated in multiple literature reviews.

=== Classification ===
Stages in prenatal development, with weeks and months numbered from last menstruation

In humans, the usual definition of preterm birth is birth before a gestational age of 37 complete weeks. In the normal human fetus, several organ systems mature between 34 and 37 weeks, and the fetus reaches adequate maturity by the end of this period. One of the main organs greatly affected by premature birth is the lungs. The lungs are one of the last organs to mature in the womb; because of this, many premature babies spend the first days and weeks of their lives on ventilators. Therefore, a significant overlap exists between preterm birth and prematurity. Generally, preterm babies are premature, and term babies are mature. Preterm babies born near 37 weeks often have no problems relating to prematurity if their lungs have developed adequate surfactant, which allows the lungs to remain expanded between breaths. Sequelae of prematurity can be reduced to a small extent by using drugs to accelerate maturation of the fetus, and to a greater extent by preventing preterm birth.

== Prevention ==
Historically, efforts have been primarily aimed at improving the survival and health of preterm infants (tertiary intervention). Such efforts, however, have not reduced the incidence of preterm birth. Increasingly, primary interventions that are directed at all women, and secondary interventions that reduce existing risks, are looked upon as measures that need to be developed and implemented to prevent the health problems of premature infants and children. Smoking bans are effective in decreasing preterm births. Different strategies are used in the administration of prenatal care, and future studies need to determine if the focus can be on screening for high-risk women, or widened support for low-risk women, or to what degree these approaches can be merged.

=== Before pregnancy ===
Adoption of specific professional policies can immediately reduce the risk of preterm birth, as the experience in assisted reproduction has shown when the number of embryos during embryo transfer was limited. Many countries have established specific programs to protect pregnant women from hazardous or night-shift work and to provide them with time for prenatal visits and paid pregnancy leave. The EUROPOP study showed that preterm birth is not related to the type of employment, but to prolonged work (over 42 hours per week) or prolonged standing (over 6 hours per day). Also, night work has been linked to preterm birth. Health policies that take these findings into account can be expected to reduce the rate of preterm birth. Preconceptional intake of folic acid is recommended to reduce birth defects. There is also some evidence that folic acid supplements preconceptionally (before becoming pregnant) may reduce premature birth. Reducing smoking is expected to benefit pregnant women and their offspring.

=== During pregnancy ===
Self-care methods to reduce the risk of preterm birth include proper nutrition, avoiding stress, seeking appropriate medical care, avoiding infections, and controlling preterm birth risk factors (e.g., working long hours while standing on feet, carbon monoxide exposure, domestic abuse, and other factors). Reducing physical activity during pregnancy has not been shown to reduce the risk of a preterm birth. Healthy eating can be instituted at any stage of the pregnancy including nutritional adjustments and consuming suggested vitamin supplements. Calcium supplementation in women who have low dietary calcium may reduce the number of negative outcomes, including preterm birth, pre-eclampsia, and maternal death. The World Health Organization (WHO) suggests 1.5–2 g of calcium supplements daily, for pregnant women who have low levels of calcium in their diet. Supplemental intake of C and E vitamins has not been found to reduce preterm birth rates.

While periodontal infection has been linked with preterm birth, randomized trials have not shown that periodontal care during pregnancy reduces preterm birth rates. Smoking cessation has also been shown to reduce the risk. The use of personal at home uterine monitoring devices to detect contractions and possible preterm births in women at higher risk of having a preterm baby have been suggested. These home monitors may not reduce the number of preterm births, however, using these devices may increase the number of unplanned antenatal visits and may reduce the number of babies admitted to special care when compared with women receiving normal antenatal care. Support from medical professionals, friends, and family during pregnancy may be beneficial at reducing caesarean birth and may reduce prenatal hospital admissions; however, these social supports alone may not prevent preterm birth. A 2026 systematic review found that pregnant women receiving doula support were less likely to give birth prematurely, although the evidence was not strong enough to establish that doula support prevents preterm birth.

==== Screening during pregnancy ====
Screening for asymptomatic bacteriuria followed by appropriate treatment reduces pyelonephritis and reduces the risk of preterm birth. Extensive studies have been carried out to determine if other forms of screening in low-risk women followed by appropriate intervention are beneficial, including screening for and treatment of Ureaplasma urealyticum, group B streptococcus, Trichomonas vaginalis, and bacterial vaginosis did not reduce the rate of preterm birth. Routine ultrasound examination of the length of the cervix may identify women at risk of preterm labour, and tentative evidence suggests ultrasound measurement of the length of the cervix in those with preterm labour can help adjust management and result in the extension of pregnancy by about four days. Screening for the presence of fibronectin in vaginal secretions is not recommended at this time in women at low risk of preterm birth.

=== Reducing existing risks ===
Women are identified to be at increased risk for preterm birth based on their past obstetrical history or the presence of known risk factors. Preconception intervention can be helpful in selected patients in a number of ways. Patients with certain uterine anomalies may have a surgical correction (i.e., removal of a uterine septum), and those with certain medical problems can be helped by optimizing medical therapies before conception, such as asthma, diabetes, hypertension, and others.

==== Multiple pregnancies ====
In multiple pregnancies, which often result from the use of assisted reproductive technology, there is a high risk of preterm birth. Selective reduction is used to reduce the number of fetuses to two or three.

==== Reducing indicated preterm birth ====
Several agents have been studied for the secondary prevention of indicated preterm birth. Trials using low-dose aspirin, fish oil, vitamin C and E, and calcium to reduce preeclampsia demonstrated some reduction in preterm birth only when low-dose aspirin was used. Even if agents such as calcium or antioxidants were able to reduce preeclampsia, a resulting decrease in preterm birth was not observed.

==== Reducing spontaneous preterm birth ====
Reduction in activity by the mother—pelvic rest, limited work, bed rest—may be recommended, although there is no evidence that it is useful, with some concerns that it is harmful. Increasing medical care by more frequent visits and more education has not been shown to reduce preterm birth rates. Use of nutritional supplements such as omega-3 polyunsaturated fatty acids is based on the observation that populations who have a high intake of such agents are at low risk for preterm birth, presumably as these agents inhibit production of proinflammatory cytokines. A randomized trial showed a significant decline in preterm birth rates, and further studies are in the making.

===== Antibiotics =====
While antibiotics can get rid of bacterial vaginosis in pregnancy, this does not appear to change the risk of preterm birth. It has been suggested that chronic chorioamnionitis is not sufficiently treated by antibiotics alone (and therefore they cannot ameliorate the need for preterm delivery in this condition).

===== Progestogens =====
Progestogens—often given in the form of vaginal progesterone or hydroxyprogesterone caproate—relax the uterine musculature, maintain cervical length, and possess anti-inflammatory properties; all of which invoke physiological and anatomical changes considered to be beneficial in reducing preterm birth. Two meta-analyses demonstrated a reduction in the risk of preterm birth in women with recurrent preterm birth by 40–55%.

Progestogen supplementation also reduces the frequency of preterm birth in pregnancies where there is a short cervix. A short cervix is less than 25mm, as detected during a transvaginal cervical length assessment in the midtrimester. However, progestogens are not effective in all populations, as a study involving twin gestations failed to see any benefit. Despite extensive research related to progestogen effectiveness, uncertainties remain concerning types of progesterone and routes of administration.

===== Cervical cerclage =====
In preparation for childbirth, the woman's cervix shortens. Preterm cervical shortening is linked to preterm birth and can be detected by ultrasonography. Cervical cerclage is a surgical intervention that places a suture around the cervix to prevent its shortening and widening. Numerous studies have been performed to assess the value of cervical cerclage, and the procedure appears helpful primarily for women with a short cervix and a history of preterm birth. Instead of a prophylactic cerclage, women at risk can be monitored during pregnancy by sonography, and when shortening of the cervix is observed, the cerclage can be performed.

== Treatment ==
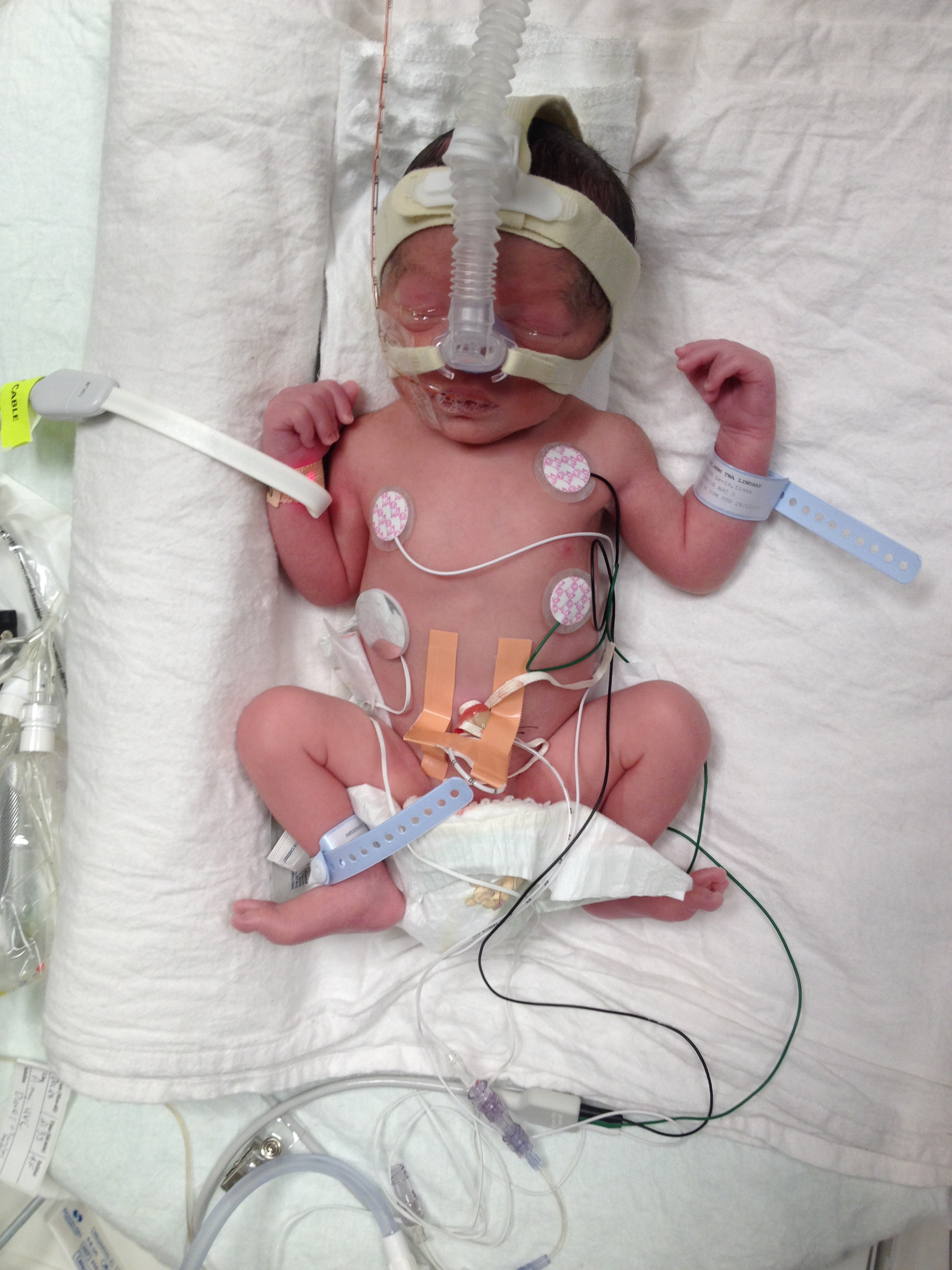
Preterm birth at 32 weeks 4 days, with a weight of 2,000 g attached to medical equipment

Tertiary interventions are aimed at women who are about to go into preterm labor, rupture the membranes, or bleed preterm. The use of the fibronectin test and ultrasonography improves the diagnostic accuracy and reduces false-positive diagnoses. While treatments to arrest early labor where there is progressive cervical dilatation and effacement will not be effective to gain sufficient time to allow the fetus to grow and mature further, it may defer delivery sufficiently to allow the mother to be brought to a specialized center that is equipped and staffed to handle preterm deliveries. In a hospital setting women are hydrated via intravenous infusion (as dehydration can lead to premature uterine contractions).

If a baby has cardiac arrest at birth and is less than 22 to 24 weeks gestational age, attempts at resuscitation are not generally indicated.

=== Steroids ===
Severely premature infants may have underdeveloped lungs because they are not yet producing their own surfactant. This can lead directly to respiratory distress syndrome, also called hyaline membrane disease, in the neonate. To try to reduce the risk of this outcome, pregnant mothers with threatened premature delivery prior to 34 weeks are often administered at least one course of glucocorticoids, an antenatal steroid that crosses the placental barrier and stimulates the production of surfactant in the lungs of the baby. Steroid use up to 37 weeks is also recommended by the American Congress of Obstetricians and Gynecologists. Typical glucocorticoids that would be administered in this context are betamethasone or dexamethasone, often when the pregnancy has reached viability at 23 weeks.

In cases where premature birth is imminent, a second "rescue" course of steroids may be administered 12 to 24 hours before the anticipated birth. There are still some concerns about the efficacy and side effects of a second course of steroids, but the consequences of RDS are so severe that a second course is often viewed as worth the risk. A 2015 Cochrane review (updated in 2022) supports the use of repeat dose(s) of prenatal corticosteroids for women still at risk of preterm birth seven days or more after an initial course.

A Cochrane review from 2020 recommends the use of a single course of antenatal corticosteroids to accelerate fetal lung maturation in women at risk of preterm birth. Treatment with antenatal corticosteroids reduces the risk of perinatal death, neonatal death and respiratory distress syndrome and probably reduces the risk of IVH.

Concerns about the adverse effects of prenatal corticosteroids include increased risk for maternal infection, difficulty with diabetic control, and possible long-term effects on neurodevelopmental outcomes for the infants. There is ongoing discussion about when steroids should be given (i.e., only antenatally or postnatally too) and for how long (i.e., single course or repeated administration). Despite these unknowns, there is a consensus that the benefits of a single course of prenatal glucocorticosteroids vastly outweigh the potential risks.

=== Antibiotics ===
The routine administration of antibiotics to all women with threatened preterm labor reduces the risk of the baby being infected with group B streptococcus and has been shown to reduce related mortality rates.

When membranes rupture prematurely, obstetrical management looks for the development of labor and signs of infection. Prophylactic antibiotic administration has been shown to prolong pregnancy and reduce neonatal morbidity with rupture of membranes at less than 34 weeks. Because of concern about necrotizing enterocolitis, amoxicillin or erythromycin has been recommended but not amoxicillin + clavulanic acid (co-amoxiclav).

=== Tocolysis ===
Several medications may be useful to delay delivery including: nonsteroidal anti-inflammatory drugs, calcium channel blockers, beta mimetics, and atosiban. Tocolysis rarely delays delivery beyond 24–48 hours. This delay, however, may be sufficient to allow the pregnant woman to be transferred to a center specialized for management of preterm deliveries and give administered corticosteroids to reduce neonatal organ immaturity. Meta-analyses indicate that calcium-channel blockers and an oxytocin antagonist can delay delivery by 2–7 days, and β2-agonist drugs delay by 48 hours but carry more side effects. Magnesium sulfate does not appear to be useful to prevent preterm birth. Its use before delivery, however, does appear to decrease the risk of cerebral palsy.

=== Mode of delivery ===
The routine use of caesarean section for early delivery of infants expected to have very low birth weight is controversial, and a decision concerning the route and time of delivery probably needs to be made on a case-by-case basis.

=== Neonatal care ===
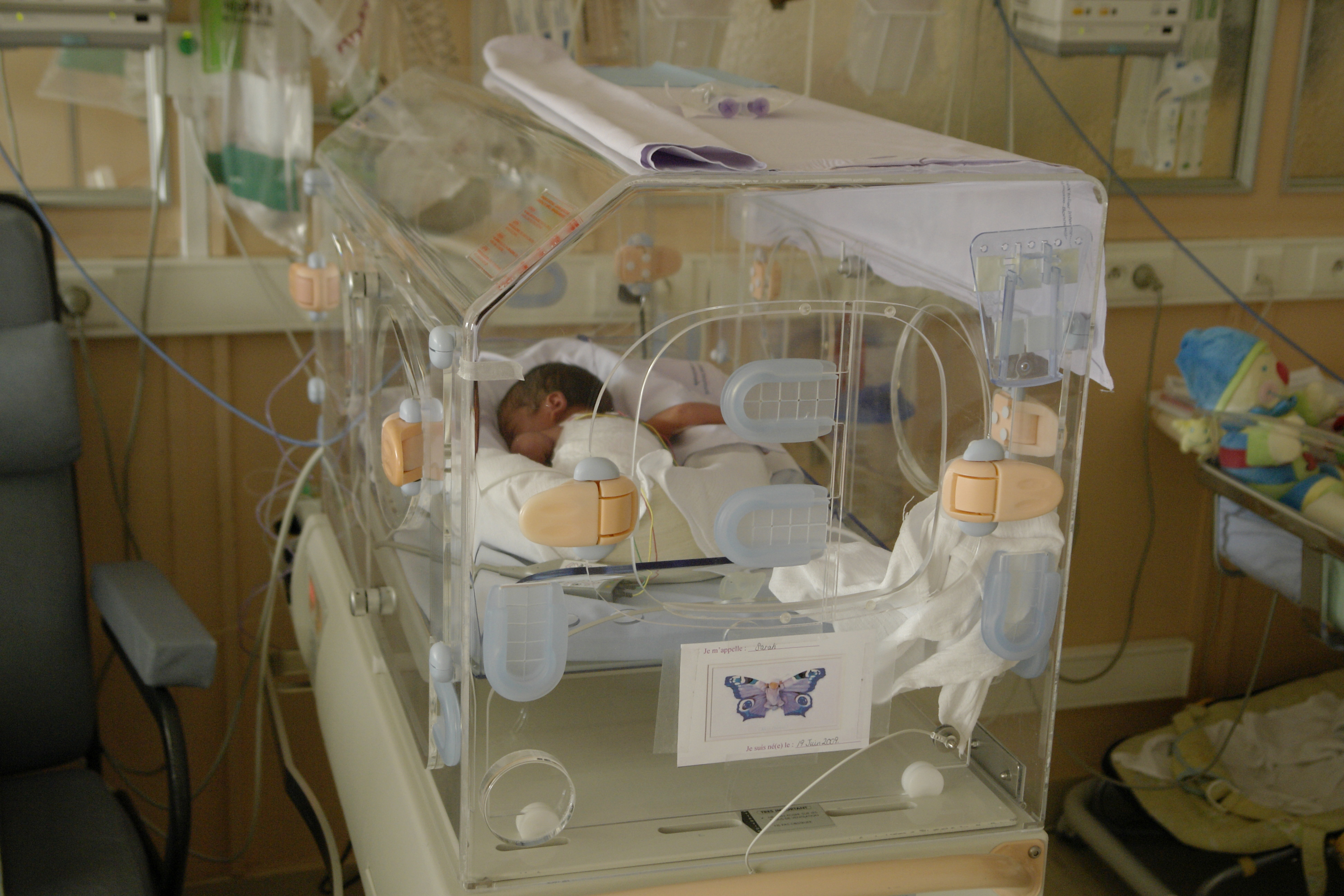
Incubator for preterm baby

In developed countries, premature infants are usually cared for in a neonatal intensive care unit (NICU). The physicians who specialize in the care of very sick or premature babies are known as neonatologists. In the NICU, premature babies are kept under radiant warmers or in incubators (also called isolettes), which are bassinets enclosed in plastic with climate control equipment designed to keep them warm and limit their exposure to germs. Modern neonatal intensive care involves sophisticated measurement of temperature, respiration, cardiac function, oxygenation, and brain activity. After delivery, plastic wraps or warm mattresses are useful to keep the infant warm on their way to the NICU. Treatments may include fluids and nutrition through intravenous catheters, oxygen supplementation, mechanical ventilation support, and medications. In developing countries where advanced equipment and even electricity may not be available or reliable, simple measures such as kangaroo care (skin-to-skin warming), encouraging breastfeeding, and basic infection control measures can significantly reduce preterm morbidity and mortality. Kangaroo mother care (KMC) can decrease the risk of neonatal sepsis, hypothermia, and hypoglycemia and increase exclusive breastfeeding. Bili lights may also be used to treat newborn jaundice (hyperbilirubinemia).

Water can be carefully provided to prevent dehydration, but not so much to increase the risks of side effects.

==== Breathing support ====
In terms of respiratory support, there may be little or no difference in the risk of death or chronic lung disease between high flow nasal cannulae (HFNC) and continuous positive airway pressure (CPAP) or nasal intermittent positive pressure ventilation (NPPV). For extremely preterm babies (born before 28 weeks' gestation), targeting a higher versus a lower oxygen saturation range makes little or no difference overall to the risk of death or major disability. Babies born before 32 weeks have been shown to have a lower risk of death from bronchopulmonary dysplasia if they have CPAP immediately after being born, compared to receiving either supportive care or assisted ventilation.

There is insufficient evidence for or against placing preterm stable twins in the same cot or incubator (co-bedding).

=== Nutrition ===
Meeting the appropriate nutritional needs of preterm infants is important for long-term health. Optimal care may require a balance of meeting nutritional needs and preventing complications related to feeding. The ideal growth rate is not known; however, preterm infants usually require a higher energy intake compared to babies who are born at term. The recommended amount of milk is often prescribed based on approximated nutritional requirements of a similar-aged fetus who is not compromised. An immature gastrointestinal tract (GI tract), medical conditions (or co-morbidities), risk of aspirating milk, and necrotizing enterocolitis may lead to difficulties in meeting this high nutritional demand, and many preterm infants have nutritional deficits that may result in growth restrictions. In addition, very small preterm infants cannot coordinate sucking, swallowing, and breathing. Tolerating a full enteral feeding (the prescribed volume of milk or formula) is a priority in neonatal care as this reduces the risks associated with venous catheters, including infection, and may reduce the length of time the infant requires specialized care in the hospital. Different strategies can be used to optimize feeding for preterm infants. The type of milk/formula and fortifiers, route of administration (by mouth, tube feeding, venous catheter), timing of feeding, quantity of milk, continuous or intermittent feeding, and managing gastric residuals are all considered by the neonatal care team when optimizing care. The evidence in the form of high-quality randomized trials is generally fairly weak in this area, and for this reason, different neonatal intensive care units may have different practices, resulting in a fairly large variation in practice. The care of preterm infants also varies in different countries and depends on the resources that are available.

==== Human breast milk and formula ====
The American Academy of Pediatrics recommended feeding preterm infants human milk, finding "significant short- and long-term beneficial effects," including lower rates of necrotizing enterocolitis (NEC). In the absence of evidence from randomised controlled trials about the effects of feeding preterm infants with formula compared with mother's own breast milk, data collected from other types of studies suggest that mother's own breast milk is likely to have advantages over formula in terms of the baby's growth and development. Milk from human donors also reduces the risk of NEC by half in very low birth weight infants and very preterm infants.

Breast milk or formula alone may not be sufficient to meet the nutritional needs of some preterm infants. Fortification of breast milk or formula by adding extra nutrients is an approach often taken for feeding preterm infants to meet the high nutritional demand. High-quality randomized controlled trials are needed in this field to determine the effectiveness of fortification. It is unclear if fortification of breast milk improves outcomes in preterm babies, though it may speed growth. Supplementing human milk with extra protein may increase short-term growth, but the longer-term effects on body composition, growth and brain development are uncertain. Higher protein formula (between 3 and 4 grams of protein per kilo of body weight) may be more effective than low protein formula (less than 3 grams per kilo per day) for weight gain in formula-fed low-birth-weight infants. There is insufficient evidence about the effect on preterm babies' growth of supplementing human milk with carbohydrate, fat, and branched-chain amino acids. Conversely, there is some indication that preterm babies who cannot breastfeed may do better if they are fed only with diluted formula compared to full-strength formula, but the clinical trial evidence remains uncertain.

Individualizing the nutrients and quantities used to fortify enteral milk feeds in infants born with very low birth weight may lead to better short-term weight gain and growth, but the evidence is uncertain for longer-term outcomes and for the risk of serious illness and death. This includes targeted fortification (adjusting the level of nutrients in response to the results of a test on the breast milk) and adjustable fortification (adding nutrients based on testing the infant).

Multi-nutrient fortifier used to fortify human milk and formula has traditionally been derived from bovine milk. Fortifier derived from humans is available; however, the evidence from clinical trials is uncertain, and it is not clear if there are any differences between human-derived fortifier and bovine-derived fortifier in terms of neonatal weight gain, feeding intolerance, infections, or the risk of death.

==== Timing of feeds ====
For very preterm infants, most neonatal care centres start milk feeds gradually, rather than starting with a full enteral feeding right away; however, it is not clear if starting full enteral feeding early affects the risk of necrotising enterocolitis. In these cases, the preterm infant would be receiving the majority of their nutrition and fluids intravenously. The milk volume is usually gradually increased over the following weeks. Research into the ideal timing of enteral feeding and whether delaying enteral feeding or gradually introducing enteral feeds is beneficial at improving growth for preterm infants or low birth weight infants is needed. In addition, the ideal timing of enteral feeds to prevent side effects such as necrotising enterocolitis or mortality in preterm infants who require a packed red blood cell transfusion is not clear. Potential disadvantages of a more gradual approach to feeding preterm infants associated with less milk in the gut and include slower GI tract secretion of hormones and gut motility and slower microbial colonization of the gut.

Regarding the timing of starting fortified milk, preterm infants are often started on fortified milk/formula once they are fed 100 mL/kg of their body weight. Some neonatal specialists feel that starting to feed a preterm infant fortified milk earlier is beneficial to improve the intake of nutrients. The risks of feeding intolerance and necrotising enterocolitis related to early versus later fortification of human milk are not clear. Once the infant can go home from the hospital, there is limited evidence to support prescribing a preterm (fortified) formula.

==== Intermittent feeding versus continuous feeding ====
For infants who weigh less than 1500 grams, tube feeding is usually necessary. Most often, neonatal specialists feed preterm babies intermittently with a prescribed amount of milk over a short period of time. For example, a feed could last 10–20 minutes and be given every 3 hours. This intermittent approach is meant to mimic conditions of normal bodily functions involved with feeding and allow for a cyclic pattern in the release of gastrointestinal tract hormones to promote development of the gastrointestinal system. In certain cases, continuous nasogastric feeding is sometimes preferred. There is low to very low certainty evidence to suggest that low birth weight babies who receive continuous nasogastric feeding may reach the benchmark of tolerating full enteral feeding later than babies fed intermittently, and it is not clear if continuous feeding has any effect on weight gain or the number of interruptions in feedings. Continuous feeding may have little to no effect on the length of body growth or head circumference, and the effects of continuous feeding on the risk of developing necrotising enterocolitis are not clear.

Since preterm infants with gastro-oesophageal reflux disease do not have a fully developed antireflux mechanism, deciding on the most effective approach for nutrition is important. It is not clear if continuous bolus intragastric tube feeding is more effective compared to intermittent bolus intragastric tube feeding for feeding preterm infants with gastroesophageal reflux disease.

For infants who would benefit from intermittent bolus feeding, some infants may be fed using the "push feed" method, using a syringe to gently push the milk or formula into the stomach of the infant. Others may be fed using a gravity feeding system where the syringe is attached directly to a tube, and the milk or formula drips into the infant's stomach. It is not clear from medical studies which approach to intermittent bolus feeding is more effective or reduces adverse effects such as apnea, bradycardia, or oxygen desaturation episodes.

==== High volume feeds ====
High-volume (more than 180 mL per kilogram per day) enteral feeds of fortified or non-fortified human breast milk or formula may improve weight gain while the pre-term infant is hospitalized; however, there is insufficient evidence to determine if this approach improves growth of the neonate and other clinical outcomes, including length of hospital stay. The risks or adverse effects associated with high-volume enteral feeding of preterm infants, including aspiration pneumonia, reflux, apnea, and sudden oxygen desaturation episodes have not been reported in the trials considered in a 2021 systematic review.

==== Parenteral (intravenous) nutrition ====
For preterm infants who are born after 34 weeks of gestation ("late preterm infants") who are critically ill and cannot tolerate milk, there is some weak evidence that the infant may benefit from including amino acids and fats in the intravenous nutrition at a later time point (72 hours or longer from hospital admission) versus early (less than 72 hours from hospital admission), however further research is required to understand the ideal timing of starting intravenous nutrition.

==== Gastric residuals ====
For preterm infants in neonatal intensive care on gavage feeds, monitoring the volume and colour of gastric residuals, the milk and gastrointestinal secretions that remain in the stomach after a set amount of time, is a common standard of care practice. Gastric residual often contains gastric acid, hormones, enzymes, and other substances that may help improve digestion and mobility of the gastrointestinal tract. Analysis of gastric residuals may help guide timing of feeds. Increased gastric residual may indicate feeding intolerance, or it may be an early sign of necrotizing enterocolitis. Increased gastric residual may be caused by an underdeveloped gastrointestinal system that leads to slower gastric emptying or movement of the milk in the intestinal tract, reduced hormone or enzyme secretions from the gastrointestinal tract, duodenogastric reflux, formula, medications, and/or illness. The clinical decision to discard the gastric residuals (versus re-feeding) is often individualized based on the quantity and quality of the residual. Some experts also suggest replacing the fresh milk or curded milk and bile-stained aspirates, but not replacing the haemorrhagic residual. Evidence to support or refute the practice of re-feeding preterm infants with gastric residuals is lacking.

=== Hyponatraemia and hypernatraemia ===
Imbalances of sodium (hyponatraemia and hypernatraemia) are common in babies born preterm. Hypernatraemia (sodium levels in the serum of more than 145-150 mmol/L) is common early on in preterm babies, and the risk of hyponatraemia (sodium levels of less than 135 nmol/L) increases after about a week of birth if left untreated and prevention approaches are not used. Preventing complications associated with sodium imbalances is part of the standard of care for preterm infants and includes careful monitoring of water and sodium given to the infant. The optimal sodium dose given immediately after birth (first day) is not clear, and further research is needed to understand the idea management approach.

=== Hearing assessment ===
The Joint Committee on Infant Hearing (JCIH) states that preterm infants who are in the neonatal intensive care unit (NICU) for a prolonged time should have a diagnostic audiologic evaluation before they are discharged from the hospital. Well babies follow a 1-2-3-month benchmark timeline where they are screened, diagnosed, and receiving intervention for a hearing loss. However, for very premature babies, it might not be possible to complete a hearing screen at one month of age due to several factors. Once the baby is stable, an audiologic evaluation should be performed. For premature babies in the NICU, auditory brainstem response (ABR) testing is recommended. If the infant does not pass the screen, they should be referred for an audiologic evaluation by an audiologist. If the infant is on aminoglycosides such as gentamicin for less than five days, they should be monitored and have a follow-up 6–7 months of being discharged from the hospital to ensure there is no late onset hearing loss due to the medication.

== Outcomes and prognosis ==
Preterm infants' survival rates

Deaths from preterm birth complications

Preterm births can result in a range of problems, including mortality and physical and mental delays.

=== Mortality and morbidity ===
In the U.S., where many neonatal infections and other causes of neonatal death have been markedly reduced, prematurity is the leading cause of neonatal mortality at 25%. Prematurely born infants are also at greater risk for having subsequent serious chronic health problems, as discussed below.

The earliest gestational age at which the infant has at least a 50% chance of survival is referred to as the limit of viability. As NICU care has improved over the last 40 years, the limit of viability has reduced to approximately 24 weeks. Most newborns who die, and 40% of older infants who die, were born between 20 and 25.9 weeks (gestational age), during the second trimester.

As the risk of brain damage and developmental delay is significant at that threshold, even if the infant survives, there are ethical controversies over the aggressiveness of the care rendered to such infants. The limit of viability has also become a factor in the abortion debate.

=== Specific risks for the preterm neonate ===
Preterm infants usually show physical signs of prematurity in inverse proportion to the gestational age. As a result, they are at risk for numerous medical problems affecting different organ systems.

- Neurological problems can include apnea of prematurity, hypoxic-ischemic encephalopathy (HIE), retinopathy of prematurity (ROP), developmental disability, transient hyperammonemia, cerebral palsy, and intraventricular hemorrhage, the latter affecting 25% of babies born preterm, usually before 32 weeks of pregnancy. Mild brain bleeds usually leave no or few lasting complications, but severe bleeds often result in brain damage or even death. Neurodevelopmental problems have been linked to lack of maternal thyroid hormones, at a time when their own thyroid is unable to meet postnatal needs.
- Cardiovascular complications may arise from the failure of the ductus arteriosus to close after birth: patent ductus arteriosus (PDA).
- Respiratory problems are common, specifically respiratory distress syndrome (RDS or IRDS) (previously called hyaline membrane disease). Another problem can be bronchopulmonary dysplasia or BPD, a form of chronic lung disease.
- Gastrointestinal and metabolic issues can arise from neonatal hypoglycemia, feeding difficulties, rickets of prematurity, hypocalcemia, inguinal hernia, and necrotizing enterocolitis (NEC).
- Hematologic complications include anemia of prematurity, thrombocytopenia, and hyperbilirubinemia (jaundice) that can lead to kernicterus.
- Infection, including sepsis, pneumonia, and urinary tract infection.

=== Survival ===
The chance of survival at 22 weeks is about 6%, while at 23 weeks it is 26%, at 24 weeks 55%, and at 25 weeks about 72% as of 2016. With extensive treatment, up to 30% of those who survive birth at 22 weeks survive longer term as of 2019. The chances of survival without long-term difficulties is less. Of those who survive following birth at 22 weeks 33% have severe disabilities. In the developed world, overall survival is about 90% while in low-income countries survival rates are about 10%.

Some children will adjust well during childhood and adolescence, although disability is more likely nearer the limits of viability. A large study followed children born between 22 and 25 weeks until the age of 6 years old. Of these children, 46% had moderate to severe disabilities such as cerebral palsy, vision or hearing loss and learning disabilities, 34% had mild disabilities, and 20% had no disabilities; 12% had disabling cerebral palsy. Up to 15% of premature infants have significant hearing loss.

As survival has improved, the focus of interventions directed at the newborn has shifted to reduce long-term disabilities, particularly those related to brain injury. Some of the complications related to prematurity may not be apparent until years after the birth. A long-term study demonstrated that the risks of medical and social disabilities extend into adulthood and are higher with decreasing gestational age at birth and include cerebral palsy, intellectual disability, disorders of psychological development, behavior, and emotion, disabilities of vision and hearing, and epilepsy. Standard intelligence tests showed that 41% of children born between 22 and 25 weeks had moderate or severe learning disabilities when compared to the test scores of a group of similar classmates who were born at full term. It is also shown that higher levels of education were less likely to be obtained with decreasing gestational age at birth. People born prematurely may be more susceptible to developing depression as teenagers. Some of these problems can be described as being within the executive domain and have been speculated to arise due to decreased myelinization of the frontal lobes. Studies of people born premature and investigated later with MRI brain imaging, demonstrate qualitative anomalies of brain structure and grey matter deficits within temporal lobe structures and the cerebellum that persist into adolescence. Throughout life they are more likely to require services provided by physical therapists, occupational therapists, or speech therapists. They are more likely to develop type 1 diabetes (roughly 1.2 times the rate) and type 2 diabetes (1.5 times).

Despite the neurosensory, mental, and educational problems studied in school-age and adolescent children born extremely preterm, the majority of preterm survivors born during the early years of neonatal intensive care are found to do well and to live fairly normal lives in young adulthood. Young adults born preterm seem to acknowledge that they have more health problems than their peers, yet feel the same degree of satisfaction with their quality of life.

Beyond the neurodevelopmental consequences of prematurity, infants born preterm have a greater risk for many other health problems. For instance, children born prematurely have an increased risk for developing chronic kidney disease.

== Epidemiology ==
Disability-adjusted life year for prematurity and low birth weight per 100,000 inhabitants in 2004: No data Less than 120 120–240 240–360 360–480 480–600 600–720 720–840 840–960 960–1080 1080–1200 1200–1500 More than 1500

Preterm birth complicates 5–18% of births worldwide. In Europe and many developed countries the preterm birth rate is generally 5–9%, while in the U.S. from 2007 to 2022 the rate fluctuated from 9.6 to 10.5 per cent.

As weight is easier to determine than gestational age, the World Health Organization tracks rates of low birth weight (< 2,500 grams), which occurred in 16.5% of births in less developed regions in 2000. It is estimated that one third of these low birth weight deliveries are due to preterm delivery. Weight generally correlates to gestational age; however, infants may be underweight for other reasons than a preterm delivery. Neonates of low birth weight (LBW) have a birth weight of less than 2,500 g (5 lb 8 oz) and are mostly but not exclusively preterm babies, as they also include small for gestational age (SGA) babies. Weight-based classification further recognizes Very Low Birth Weight (VLBW) which is less than 1,500 g, and Extremely Low Birth Weight (ELBW) which is less than 1,000 g. Almost all neonates in these latter two groups are born preterm.

About 75% of nearly a million deaths due to preterm delivery would survive if provided warmth, breastfeeding, treatments for infection, and breathing support. Complications from preterm births resulted in 740,000 deaths in 2013, down from 1.57 million in 1990.

== Society and culture ==
=== Economics ===
Preterm birth is a significant cost factor in healthcare, not even considering the expenses of long-term care for individuals with disabilities due to preterm birth. A 2003 study in the U.S. determined neonatal costs to be $224,400 for a newborn at 500–700 g versus $1,000 at over 3,000 g. The costs increase exponentially with decreasing gestational age and weight. The 2007 Institute of Medicine report Preterm Birth found that the 550,000 premature babies born each year in the U.S. run up about $26 billion in annual costs, mostly related to care in neonatal intensive care units, but the real tab may top $50 billion.

=== Notable cases ===
James Elgin Gill (born on 20 May 1987 in Ottawa, Ontario, Canada) was the earliest premature baby in the world, until that record was broken in 2004. He was 128 days premature, 21 weeks 5 days gestation, and weighed 624 g (1 lb 6 oz). He survived.

In 2014, Lyla Stensrud, born in San Antonio, Texas, U.S., became the youngest premature baby in the world. She was born at 21 weeks 4 days and weighed 410 grams (less than a pound). Kaashif Ahmad resuscitated the baby after she was born. As of November 2018, Lyla was attending preschool. She had a slight delay in speech, but no other known medical issues or disabilities.

Amillia Taylor is also often cited as the most premature baby. She was born on 24 October 2006 in Miami, Florida, U.S., at 21 weeks and 6 days' gestation. This report has created some confusion as her gestation was measured from the date of conception (through in vitro fertilization) rather than the date of her mother's last menstrual period, making her appear 2 weeks younger than if gestation was calculated by the more common method. At birth, she was 23 cm (9 in) long and weighed 280 g (10 oz). She had digestive and respiratory problems, together with a brain hemorrhage. She was discharged from the Baptist Children's Hospital on 20 February 2007.

The record for the smallest premature baby to survive was held for a considerable amount of time by Madeline Mann, who was born in 1989 at 26 weeks, weighing 280.0 g (9.875 oz) and measuring 24 cm (9.5 in) long. This record was broken in September 2004 by Rumaisa Rahman, who was born in the same hospital, Loyola University Medical Center in Maywood, Illinois. at 25 weeks' gestation. At birth, she was 20 cm (8 in) long and weighed 261 g (9.2 oz). Her twin sister was also a small baby, weighing 563 g (1 lb 3.9 oz) at birth. During pregnancy their mother had pre-eclampsia, requiring birth by caesarean section. The larger twin left the hospital at the end of December, while the smaller remained there until 10 February 2005, by which time her weight had increased to 1.18 kg (2 lb 10 oz). Generally healthy, the twins had to undergo laser eye surgery to correct vision problems, a common occurrence among premature babies.

In May 2019, Sharp Mary Birch Hospital for Women & Newborns in San Diego announced that a baby nicknamed "Saybie" had been discharged almost five months after being born at 23 weeks' gestation and weighing 244 g (8.6 oz). Saybie was confirmed by Dr. Edward Bell of the University of Iowa, which keeps the Tiniest Babies Registry, to be the new smallest surviving premature baby in that registry.

Born in February 2009, at Children's Hospitals and Clinics of Minnesota, Jonathon Whitehill was just 25 weeks' gestation with a weight of 310 g (11 oz). He was hospitalized in a neonatal intensive care unit for five months, and then discharged.

Richard Hutchinson was born at Children's Hospitals and Clinics of Minnesota in Minneapolis, Minnesota, on June 5, 2020, at 21 weeks 2 days of gestation. At birth he weighed 340 g (12 oz). He remained hospitalized until November 2020, when he was discharged.

On 5 July 2020, Curtis Means was born at the University of Alabama at Birmingham hospital at 21 weeks 1 day, and weighed 420 g (15 oz). He was discharged in April 2021.

Born on 5 July 2024 at exactly 21 weeks of gestation with a weight of 10 ounces (280 g), Nash Keen is currently the world's most premature child according to Guinness World Records. He was discharged from the hospital at the age of six months.

Historical figures who were born prematurely include Richard II of England (born in 1367), Johannes Kepler (born in 1571 at seven months' gestation), Isaac Newton (born in 1642, small enough to fit into a quart mug, according to his mother), Winston Churchill (born in 1874 at seven months' gestation), and Anna Pavlova (born in 1885 at seven months' gestation).

=== Effect of the coronavirus pandemic ===
During the COVID-19 pandemic, a drastic drop in the rate of premature births was reported in many countries, ranging from a 20% reduction to a 90% drop in the starkest cases. Studies in Ireland and Denmark first noticed the phenomenon, and it has been confirmed elsewhere. There is no universally accepted explanation for this drop as of August 2020. Hypotheses include additional rest and support for expectant mothers staying at home, less air pollution due to shutdowns and reduced car fumes, and reduced likelihood of catching other diseases and viruses in general due to the lockdowns.

== Research ==
Brain injury is common among preterms, ranging from white matter injury to intraventricular and cerebellar haemorrhages. The characteristic neuropathology of preterms has been described as the "encephalopathy of prematurity". The number of preterms that receive special education is doubled compared to the general population. School marks are lower and so are verbal learning, executive function, language skills, and memory performance scores, as well as IQ scores. Behaviourally, adolescents who were born very preterm and/or very low birth weight have similar self-reports of quality of life, health status, and self-esteem as term controls.

Various structural magnetic resonance studies found consistent reductions in whole brain volume. The extensive list of particular regions with smaller volumes compared to controls includes many cortical areas (temporal, frontal, parietal, occipital and cingulate), the hippocampal regions, thalamus, basal ganglia, amygdala, brain stem, internal capsule, corpus callosum, and cerebellum. Brain volume reduction seems to be present throughout the whole brain. In contrast, larger volumes were found in some of the same areas, including medial/anterior frontal, parietal, and temporal cortex, cerebellum, middle temporal gyrus, parahippocampal gyrus, and fusiform gyrus, as well as larger lateral ventricles on average. The cause of these inconsistencies are unknown. Additionally, reductions in cortical surface area/cortical thickness were found in the temporal lobes bilaterally and in left frontal and parietal areas. Thicker cortex was found bilaterally in the medial inferior and anterior parts of the frontal lobes and in the occipital lobes. Gestational age was positively correlated with volumes of the temporal and fusiform gyri and sensorimotor cortex bilaterally, left inferior parietal lobule, brain stem, and various white matter tracts, as well as specific positive associations with the cerebellum and thalamus. Several structural brain alterations have been linked to cognitive and behavioural outcome measures. For example, total brain tissue volume explained between 20 and 40% of the IQ and educational outcome differences between extremely preterm-born adolescents and control adolescents. In another study, a 25% quartile decrease in white matter values in the middle temporal gyrus was associated with a 60% increase in the risk of cognitive impairment. Nosarti and colleagues previously hypothesised that maturational patterns in preterm brains were consistent with the age-related stages typically observed in younger subjects. Their most recent study suggests, however, that their trajectory may not only be delayed but also fundamentally distinctive. Since both smaller and larger regional volumes were found in very preterm individuals compared to controls.

The evidence to support the use of osteopathic manipulations to provide benefit in neonatal care is weak.

== See also ==
- World Prematurity Day
