= Late preterm infant =

Late preterm infants are infants born at a gestational age between 34 0/7 weeks and 36 6/7 weeks. They have higher morbidity and mortality rates than term infants (gestational age ≥37 weeks) due to their relative physiologic and metabolic immaturity, even though they are often the size and weight of some term infants. "Late preterm" has replaced "near term" to describe this group of infants, since near term incorrectly implies that these infants are "almost term" and only require routine neonatal care.

== Risk factors ==
Several important factors that may predispose late-preterm infants to medical conditions associated with immaturity:

- respiratory distress
- apnea
- temperature instability
- hypoglycemia
- hyperbilirubinemia
- poor feeding

At 34–35 weeks, the brain weight is only about two-thirds that of a full-term baby. This may lead to an increased risk of:

- Intellectual disability
- Developmental delay/disability
- Special needs – education
- Retention in kindergarten
- Cerebral palsy

== Neonatal nutrition ==
Late preterm infants have an increased risk of being underweight and stunted at 12 and 24 months of age versus term infants.

Proper nutrition is essential for normal growth, optimal neurologic and cognitive development, immune protection, and long-term health.

== Feeding ==
The last trimester of pregnancy the fetus is expressing active amino acid transport, calcium, lipid transfer, and glucose facilitated diffusion. Delivery of the premature infant requires higher energy expenditure, but with inadequate intake the infant will have negative nitrogen balance. There are higher needs for Calcium, Phosphorus, and Vitamin D.

== Early nutrition and cognitive outcome ==
For every 10 kcal/kg increase in energy intake in the first week of life, there is a 4.6 point increase in MDI (Mental Development Index) at 18 months. For every 1 g/kg increase in protein intake in the first week of life, there is an 8.2 point increase in MDI at 18 months.

== Challenges to feeding ==
Sources:

- Small mouth and immature oral muscle
- Weak suck and poor latch
- Easily tire with feeding
- Maternal delayed milk production

== When to start feeding ==
Factors such as hemodynamic stability, severe IUGR, respiratory, abdominal exam, whether feeding cues are present, and stable glucose could all effect the timing of nutrition. Some preterm infants will be NPO (nil per os). If infants are unable to start oral or enteral intake intravenous fluids may begin with amino acids or total parenteral nutrition.

According to the American Academy of Pediatrics section on breastfeeding recommendations are all infants should receive human milk.

== Nutrient needs by gestational age ==
Variables	34-36	37-38	39-41
Fetal Growth			
Weight gain, g	13	11	10
Lean body mass gain, g	10.5	7.2	6.6
Protein gain, g	1.6	1.3	1.2
Requirements			
Energy, kcal	127	115	110
Proteins, g	3.1	2.5	2
Calcium, mg	120-140	70-120	70-120
Phosphorus, mg	60-90	35-75	35-75

== Fortifiers ==
Use caution when fortifying single nutrients to prevent alteration of protein/energy ratio. Centers for Disease Control (CDC) recommends that sterile formulas and fortifiers be used when mom is not available. Powdered formula and HMF may be contaminants. Start with the mom's diet during breastfeeding. Mom should be eating adequate calories, protein, B vitamins and DHA.

=== How much ===
Due to lower capacity for feed volume and lower sucking ability relative to infants born at full term, late preterm infants may require more frequent feeding. Failure of the infant to adequately feed can contribute to the development of jaundice.

=== Colostrum production ===
Colostrum production can range from 26 to 56 mL the first day to 113–185 mL for day two. Although colostrum production is not voluminous, it can still meet the needs of the newborn.

=== Feeding methods ===
- Direct Breast Feeding
- Feeding tube at breast
- Cup/Finger feeding
- Bottle Feeding
- Gavage Tube (bolus feeding)

== Strategies to improve outcome ==
=== Early nutrition ===
- Colostrum Diet; Mother's own milk [Contains: Lactoferrin, Secretory IgA, Lysozyme, contains oligosaccharides (beneficial growth of good gut bacteria), and hormones]
- Trophic Feeds (beneficial effect on maturation of the intestinal tract)
- Donor Milk
- Fortify human milk
- Consistency in feedings important
