= Fern test =

Medical test

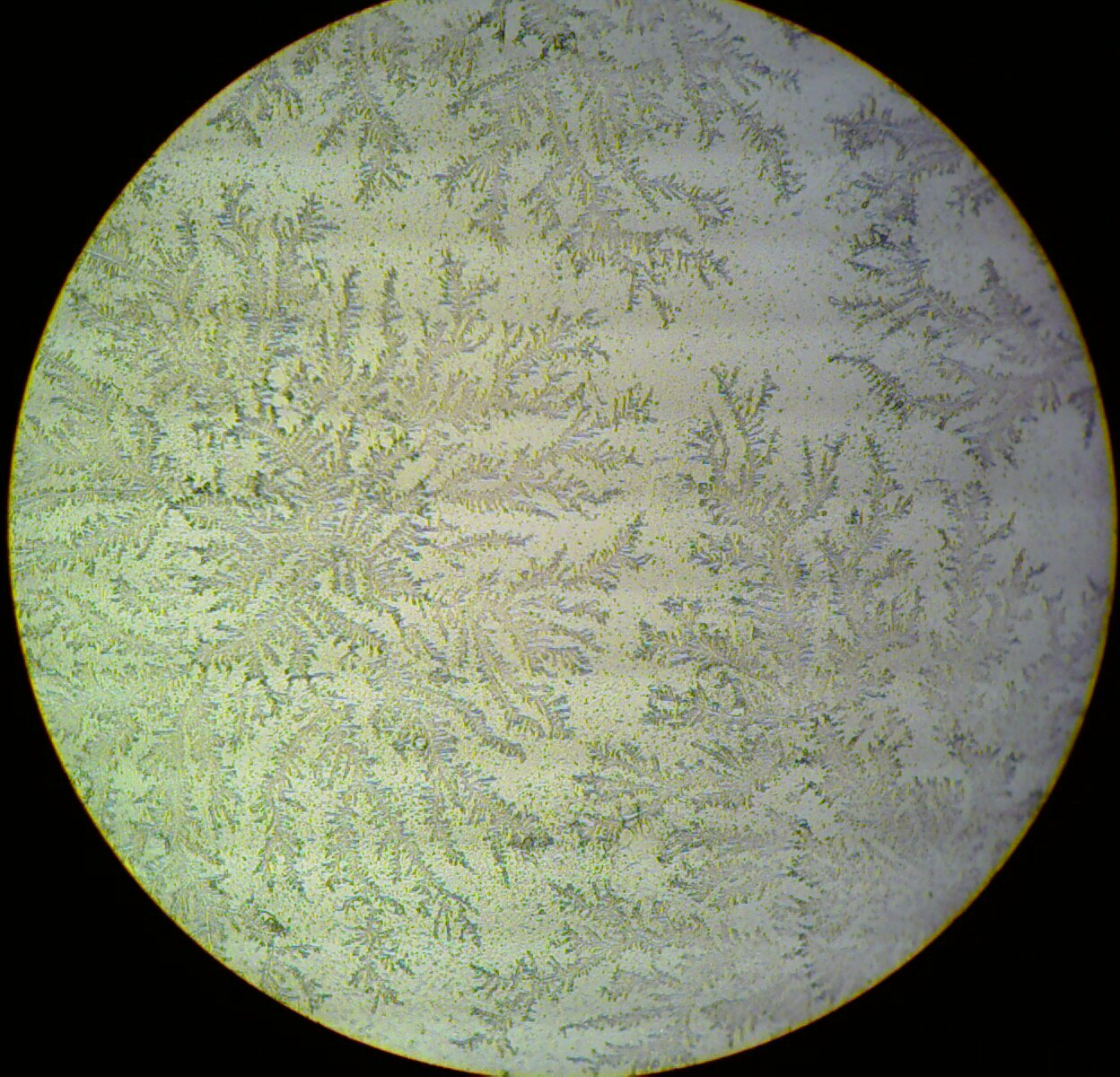
Positive fern test with amniotic fluid as seen under the microscope

The fern test is a medical laboratory test used in obstetrics and gynecology. The name refers to the detection of a characteristic "fern like" pattern of vaginal secretions when a specimen is allowed to dry on a glass slide and is viewed under a low-power microscope. The fern test is most commonly used to provide evidence of the presence of amniotic fluid and is used in obstetrics to detect preterm premature rupture of membranes and/or the onset of labor. It also may provide indirect evidence of ovulation and fertility, although it does not predict the time of ovulation.

Ferning was first described in the field of gynecology in 1945 by Georgios Papanikolaou, inventor of the Pap smear, as a test for ovulation during a normal menstrual cycle. When high levels of estrogen are present, such as just before ovulation (or during pregnancy), the cervical mucus forms fern-like patterns due to crystallization of sodium chloride on mucus fibers. This pattern is known as arborization or 'ferning'. When progesterone is the dominant hormone, as it would be in the second half of a normal cycle, the fern pattern is no longer discernible, and the pattern is completely absent by the 22nd day of an individual’s cycle after ovulation (assuming a 28-day cycle). The disappearance of the fern pattern after the 22nd day suggests ovulation, and its persistence throughout the menstrual cycle may suggest an anovulatory cycle.

Ferning is now most commonly used as a test for prelabor rupture of membranes which refers to the rupture of the amniotic sac during pregnancy. The sodium chloride content of amniotic fluid secreted by the fetal kidneys may be indicative that membrane rupture has occurred, though the pattern of 'ferning' seen in amniotic fluid is distinct from that seen in cervical mucus. Amniotic fluid tends to produce a more delicate pattern, compared to a thick and wide arborization pattern seen in dried cervical mucus.

False positive results are mostly attributable to cervical mucus, though have been reported due to semen and fingerprints, while false negatives are attributable to inadequate fluid available at the time of specimen collection, or contamination from leukorrhea, blood or meconium. Additionally, the accuracy of ferning is markedly less in women who are not in labor as compared to those in labor, with a reported sensitivity and specificity of 51% and 70%, respectively, in patients without labor and 98% and 88%, respectively, in patients in labor.
