= Fetal fibronectin =

Fetal fibronectin (fFN) is a fibronectin protein produced by fetal cells. It is found at the interface of the chorion and the decidua (between the fetal sac and the uterine lining). Fetal fibronectin is found normally in vaginal fluid in early pregnancy prior to 22 weeks due to normal growth and development of tissues at the junction of the uterus and amniotic sac. It may also be found in vaginal fluid after 36 weeks as labor approaches. However, fFN should not be detected between 22 and 36 weeks.

It can be thought of as an adhesive or "biological glue" that binds the fetal sac to the uterine lining. It is the product of alternative splicing of the fibronectin gene and contains a oncofetal domain not present in adult fibronectin.

== Screening test ==
Fetal fibronectin
- Purpose: test of pre-term birth

Fetal fibronectin "leaks" into the vagina if a preterm delivery is likely to occur and can be measured in a screening test.

Testing will produce a negative or a positive result. A positive result indicates that fetal fibronectin is present in the cervical secretions. A positive result between 22 and 34 weeks gestation signals an increased risk of preterm birth within the next 7 days. A negative result indicates that there is not fetal fibronectin in the cervical secretions. Fetal fibronectin testing has poor specificity (64%) and positive predictive value (10%). Because of this, the American College of Obstetricians and Gynecologists does not consider positive fFN as diagnostic of prelabor rupture of membranes in the absence of other signs and symptoms and cautions that "these test kits should be considered ancillary to standard methods of diagnosis."

While the specificity and positive predictive value are poor, fetal fibronectin testing has excellent sensitivity (100%) and negative predictive value (100%). Therefore, a negative fFN test is a very strong indicator that preterm birth is not likely to occur within the next 7 days. A 2019 Cochrane Review found that while management based on the results of fFN appeared to reduce preterm birth before 37 weeks, the quality of evidence was low.

The test is easily performed and is usually painless. A specimen is collected from the patient using a vaginal swab. The swab is placed in a transport tube and sent to a laboratory for testing. Most labs can easily produce a result in less than one hour.

At or after 22 weeks of gestation, fFN levels greater than or equal to 50 ng/mL are associated with an increased risk of spontaneous preterm birth.

A false positive fetal fibronectin result can occur if the test is performed after digital examination of the cervix or after having had intercourse. It is important that the swab be taken before a digital cervical examination or more than 24 hours following intercourse or previous examination.

== See also ==
- Fibronectin
- Fibronectin type II domain
- Premature labor
