= Nitrazine =

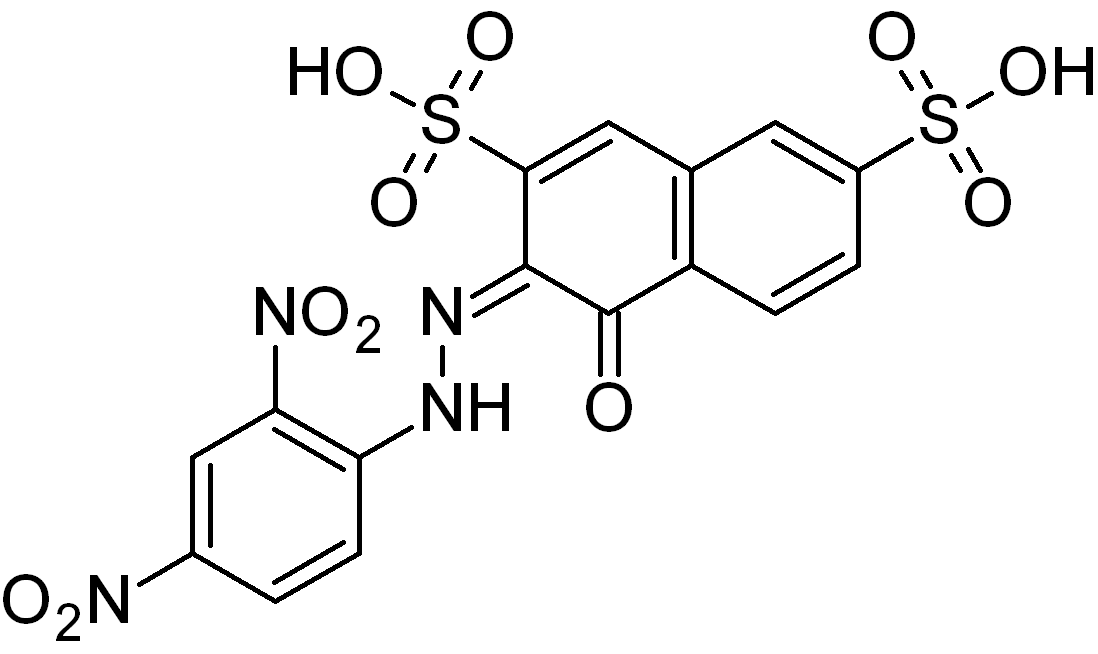

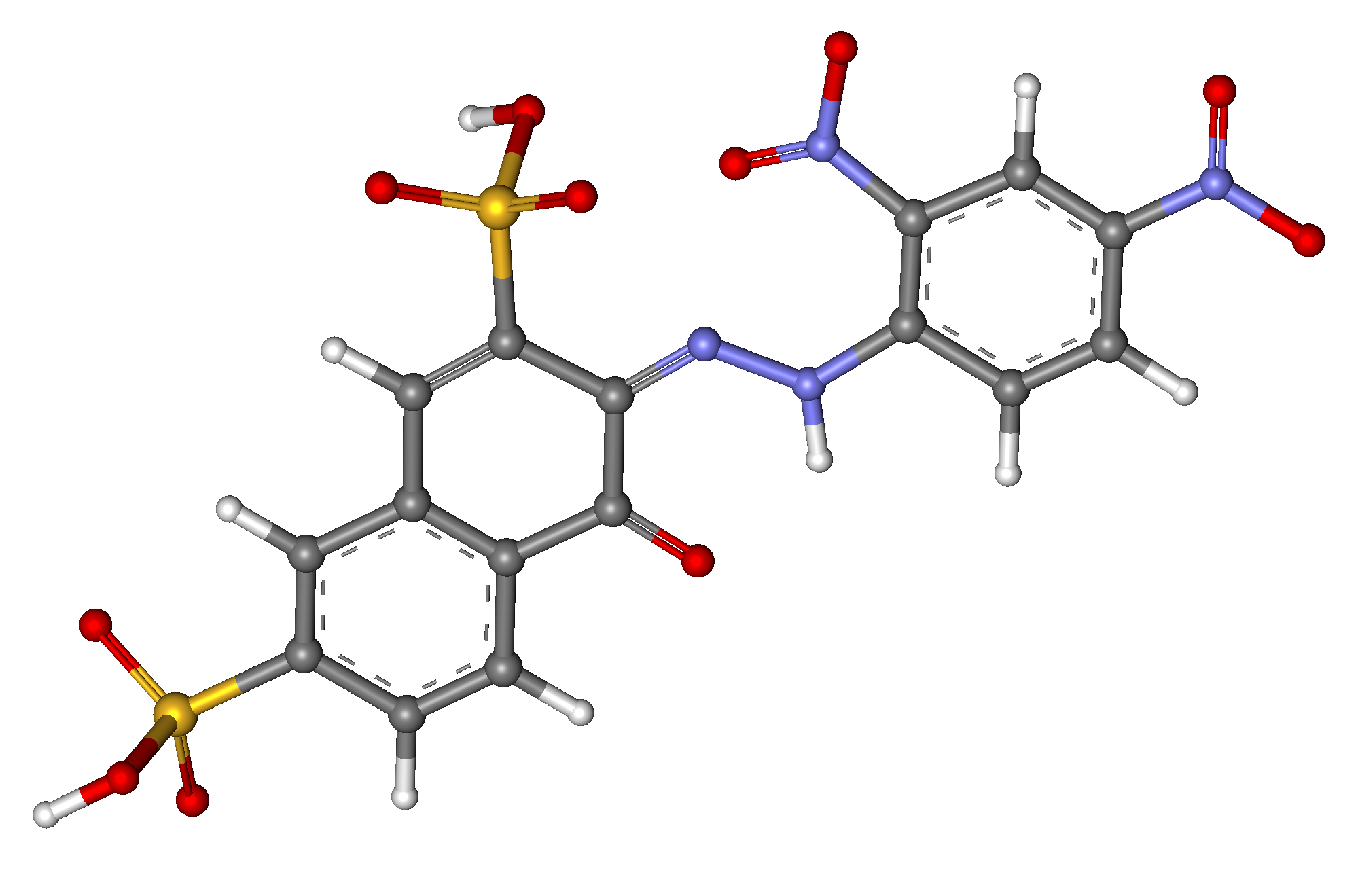

Names
- IUPAC name (3E)-3-[(2,4-Dinitrophenyl)hydrazono]-4-oxonaphthalene-2,7-disulfonic acid
- Other names Nitrazine yellow; Phenaphthazine

Identifiers
CAS Number	1716-22-9; 5423-07-4 (disodium)
3D model (JSmol)	Interactive image
ChemSpider	5288340
PubChem CID	6911856
UNII	USH6E4Z2F7; 4U1WVN6KUX (disodium)
- InChI: InChI=1S/C16H10N4O11S2/c21-16-11-3-2-10(32(26,27)28)5-8(11)6-14(33(29,30)31)15(16)18-17-12-4-1-9(19(22)23)7-13(12)20(24)25/h1-7,17H,(H,26,27,28)(H,29,30,31)/b18-15- Key: IHRSXGONVFFQQF-SDXDJHTJSA-N; InChI=1/C16H10N4O11S2/c21-16-11-3-2-10(32(26,27)28)5-8(11)6-14(33(29,30)31)15(16)18-17-12-4-1-9(19(22)23)7-13(12)20(24)25/h1-7,17H,(H,26,27,28)(H,29,30,31)/b18-15- Key: IHRSXGONVFFQQF-SDXDJHTJBN
- SMILES: [O-][N+](=O)c1ccc(c([N+]([O-])=O)c1)N/N=C3/C(=C\c2c(ccc(c2)S(=O)(=O)O)C3=O)S(=O)(=O)O

Properties
Chemical formula	C_{16}H_{10}N_{4}O_{11}S_{2}
Molar mass	498.40 g/mol
- Except where otherwise noted, data are given for materials in their standard state (at 25 °C [77 °F], 100 kPa). verify (what is ?) Infobox references

Nitrazine or phenaphthazine is a pH indicator dye often used in medicine. More sensitive than litmus, nitrazine indicates pH in the range of 4.5 to 7.5. Nitrazine is usually used as the disodium salt.

== Use ==
Nitrazine (pH indicator)
below pH 4.5		above pH 7.5
(yellow) 4.5	⇌	7.5 (blue)

- This test is done to ascertain the nature of fluid in the vagina during pregnancy especially when premature rupture of membranes (PROM) is suspect. This test involves putting a drop of fluid obtained from the vagina onto paper strips containing nitrazine dye. The strips change color depending on the pH of the fluid. The strips will turn blue if the pH is greater than 6.0. A blue strip means it's more likely the membranes have ruptured.

This test, however, can produce false positives. If blood gets in the sample or if there is an infection present, the pH of the vaginal fluid may be higher than normal. Semen also has a higher pH, so recent vaginal intercourse can produce a false reading.

- To perform a fecal pH test for diagnosing intestinal infections or other digestive problems
- In civil engineering, to determine the carbonatation spread in concrete structures and therefore assess the state of the rebar's passivation film.
