= Cervical pessary =

Medical Device

Cervical pessary is a medical device used to treat an incompetent (or insufficient) cervix (cervix starts to shorten and open too early). Early in the pregnancy a round silicone pessary is placed at the opening to the cervix to close it, and then it's removed later in the pregnancy when the risk of a preterm birth has passed.

Pregnant women are at risk of giving birth too early when their cervix begin to efface (shorten) and dilate (open). Different treatments have been tried to prevent a late miscarriage or preterm birth. A common treatment is cervical cerclage or stitch when a suture is stitched around the opening of the cervix around 12–14 weeks into the pregnancy.

A cervical pessary is being studied as an alternative to cervical cerclage since there are fewer potential complications. More medical studies are needed to decide whether a cervical pessary is equal to or the best treatment.
