= Cervical weakness =

Cervical insufficiency
- Specialty: Obstetrics and gynaecology

Cervical weakness, also called cervical incompetence or cervical insufficiency, is a medical condition of pregnancy in which the cervix begins to dilate (widen) and efface (thin) before the pregnancy has reached term. Definitions of cervical weakness vary, but one that is frequently used is the inability of the uterine cervix to retain a pregnancy in the absence of the signs and symptoms of clinical contractions, or labor, or both in the second trimester.

Cervical weakness may cause miscarriage or preterm birth during the second and third trimesters. It has been estimated that cervical insufficiency complicates about 1% of pregnancies, and that it is a cause in about 8% of women with second trimester recurrent miscarriages.

A sign of cervical weakness is funneling at the internal orifice of the uterus, which is a dilation of the cervical canal at this location.

In cases of cervical weakness, dilation and effacement of the cervix may occur without pain or uterine contractions. In a normal pregnancy, dilation and effacement occurs in response to uterine contractions. Cervical weakness becomes a problem when the cervix is pushed to open by the growing pressure in the uterus as pregnancy progresses. If the responses are not halted, rupture of the membranes and birth of a premature baby can result.

The older terminology is perceived as blaming the woman for the miscarriage, as if she were an incompetent or insufficient person. Consequently, cervical weakness is the recommended term.

== Risk factors ==
Risk factors for premature birth or stillbirth due to cervical weakness include:

- diagnosis of cervical weakness in a previous pregnancy
- previous preterm premature rupture of membranes
- history of conization (cervical biopsy)
- diethylstilbestrol exposure, which can cause anatomical defects, and
- uterine anomalies

== Diagnosis ==
Diagnosis of cervical weakness can be challenging and is based on a history of painless cervical dilation usually after the first trimester without contractions or labor and in the absence of other clear pathology. In addition to history, some providers use assessment of cervical length in second trimester to identify cervical shortening using ultrasound. However, short cervical length has actually been shown to be a marker of preterm birth rather than cervical weakness.

Other diagnostic tests that have been suggested which have not been validated include hysterosalpingography and radiographic imaging of balloon traction on the cervix, assessment of the patulous cervix with Hegar or Pratt dilators, the use of a balloon elastance test, and use of graduated cervical dilators to calculate a cervical resistance index.

Normally, the cervix should be at least 30 mm in length. Cervical weakness is variably defined. However, a common definition is a cervical length of less than 25 mm at or before 24 weeks of gestational age. The risk of preterm birth is inversely proportional to cervical length:

- Less than 25 mm; 18% risk of preterm birth
- Less than 20 mm; 25% risk of preterm birth
- Less than 15 mm; 50% risk of preterm birth

== Treatment ==
Cervical weakness is not generally treated except when it appears to threaten a pregnancy. Cervical weakness can be treated using cervical cerclage, a surgical technique that reinforces the cervical muscle by placing sutures above the opening of the cervix to narrow the cervical canal.

Cerclage procedures usually entail closing the cervix through the vagina with the aid of a speculum. Another approach involves performing the cerclage through an abdominal incision. Transabdominal cerclage of the cervix makes it possible to place the stitch exactly at the level that is needed. It can be carried out when the cervix is very short, effaced or totally distorted. Cerclages are usually performed between weeks 12 to 14 of the pregnancy. The sutures are removed between weeks 36 and 38 to avoid problems during labor.

The complications described in the literature have been rare: hemorrhage from damage to the veins at the time of the procedure; and fetal death due to uterine vessels occlusion.

No significant differences in pregnancy outcomes were found in a study evaluating pregnancy outcomes after cervical conization. This study suggests for women with cervical insufficiency due to prior cone biopsy, cerclage is not superior to no intervention. As cerclage can induce preterm contractions without preventing premature delivery, makes the recommendation that it be used sparingly in women with a history of conization.

A cervical pessary is being studied as an alternative to cervical cerclage since there are fewer potential complications. A silicone ring is placed at the opening to the cervix early in the pregnancy, and removed later in the pregnancy prior to the time of expected delivery. Further study is needed to determine whether a cervical pessary is equal or superior to current management.
