= Reserve cell =

Subcolumnar progenitor cell of the uterine cervix

Epithelial cell types of the uterine cervix. Reserve cells (right side of image) occur beneath the columnar epithelium and can proliferate during squamous metaplasia.

Histology of the cervical transformation zone showing squamous metaplasia. Reserve cells (R) proliferate beneath the columnar epithelium (C) during the development of immature squamous metaplasia.

Reserve cells are small, relatively undifferentiated epithelial cells located beneath the columnar epithelium of the uterine cervix, particularly in and around the transformation zone. They can proliferate and differentiate into squamous epithelium and are an important cellular component of cervical squamous metaplasia.

== Histology and function ==
Histologically, reserve cells are small round or cuboidal cells with scant cytoplasm and relatively dark nuclei. They occur immediately beneath endocervical columnar cells and may be present singly, in linear arrays, or as larger proliferations termed reserve cell hyperplasia.

During squamous metaplasia, reserve cells proliferate beneath the columnar epithelium and progressively differentiate into immature and subsequently mature stratified squamous epithelium. Reserve cells and related immature metaplastic cells typically express the basal or squamous-associated markers p63, cytokeratin 5 (K5), and frequently cytokeratin 17 (K17). A 2025 study characterized cervical reserve cells as consistently K5/p63-positive, often K17-positive, and variably positive for the simple epithelial keratins K7 and K8.

== Clinical significance ==
Reserve cells are of interest in cervical pathology because immature squamous metaplasia can resemble a squamous intraepithelial lesion. CK17 and p63 expression has been used to demonstrate reserve-cell and metaplastic differentiation.

Reserve cells and immature metaplastic epithelium have also been investigated as potential target cell populations for infection by high-risk human papillomavirus (HPV). HPV-associated high-grade squamous intraepithelial lesions frequently arise in the cervical transformation zone, including regions containing proliferating reserve cells and immature squamous metaplasia.

== See also ==
- Squamous metaplasia
- Transformation zone
- Cervical intraepithelial neoplasia
- Human papillomavirus infection
