= Sanjay Anant Patil =

Indian farmer

- Born: August 31, 1964 (age 61); Ponda, Goa
- Occupation: Indian farmer
- Known for: Natural farming and zero-energy micro-irrigation systems

Sanjay Anant Patil is an Indian farmer from Ponda, Goa, known for his work in natural farming and zero-energy micro-irrigation systems. In February 2024, Patil was awarded the Padma Shri, India's fourth-highest civilian honor, for his contributions to natural farming.

== Early life and career ==
Sanjay Patil spent his childhood at his uncle's home in Shiroda, about 20 km from his village, where he attended school and learned farming activities. After completing his education up to the eleventh class, Patil worked for four years at the Goa Bagayatdar Society. He then resigned to pursue his goal of natural farming.

Patil's farming journey began in 1986. He spent initial years experimenting with various farming methods. He then traveled to Gujarat to learn about natural farming processes and returned to Goa to work on these practices. He has transformed a 10-acre plot into a farm with technical guidance from ICAR-CCARI, Goa.

== Awards ==
2013: Goa Krishi Ratna Award by the Goa government.

2015: Best Horticulturist Award Presented by Goa Bagayatdar.

2023: IARI–Innovative Farmer Award by the ICAR-Indian Agricultural Research Institute (IARI), New Delhi, for his contributions to natural farming and zero-energy micro-irrigation systems.

2023: Goa State Biodiversity Board Conservation Award.

2024: Awarded the Padma Shri.
