= Mucus plug =

Mucus plug may refer to:

- plugging of the bronchioles by mucus
- Cervical mucus plug
