= Herbal tonic =

Solution consumed to promote health

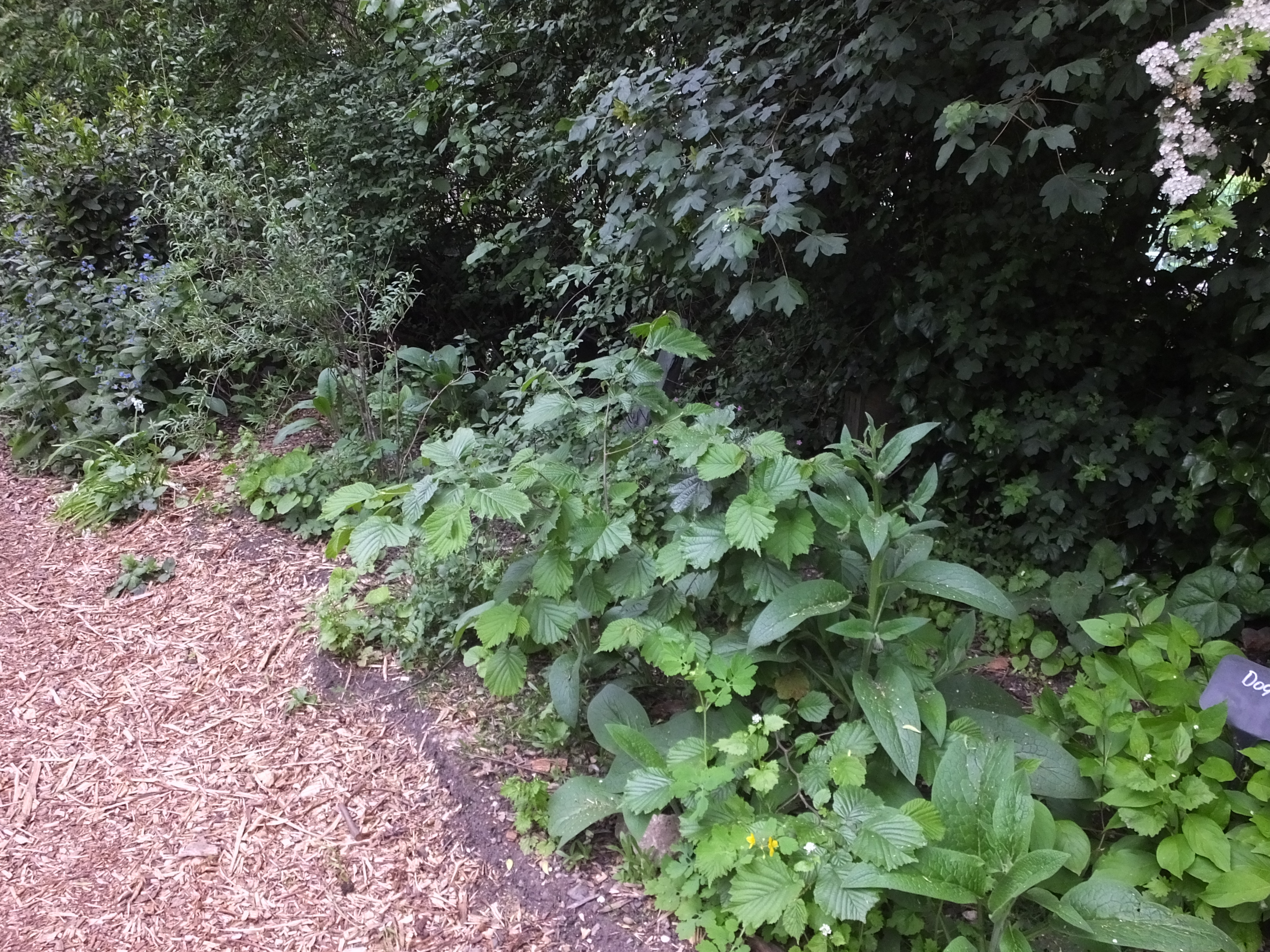
Herb garden.

In herbal medicine, a herbal tonic (also tonic herbs, tonic herbalism) is used to help restore, tone and invigorate systems in the body or to promote general health and well-being. A herbal tonic is a solution or other preparation made from a specially selected assortment of plants known as herbs. They are steeped in water and drunk either hot or cool. Herbal tonics are believed to have healing properties ranging from relieving muscle and joint pain and extend as far as inhibiting some cancers.

Herbal tonics can be dated as far back as 4,000 years ago – as a practice thought to have originated under the sphere of traditional Chinese Medicine. They were also used in Ayurvedic and Unani practices as well as in Native America. Initially, the use of herbal tonics was embedded within these traditional medicinal practices and cultures. Today, herbal tonics are consumed globally and are used as a general resource in maintaining well-being. They are found in not only hospitals and pharmacies, but in health food stores and supermarkets as well.

Although the use of herbal tonics has carried through since ancient times, it has been only since the late 1900s that herbal tonics have been used at a large rate globally. Roughly 4 billion people (primarily living in the developing world) annually spend roughly US$60 billion on herbal medicines to aid a large range of particular illness, with some individuals turning to herbal tonics due to concerns about that quality, safety, or affordability of orthodox treatments by physicians.

There is limited research into the safety and efficacy of herbal tonics – what is known is that some herbs contain specific chemicals and minerals which have known effects on the human body.

== History ==
=== Chinese medicine ===
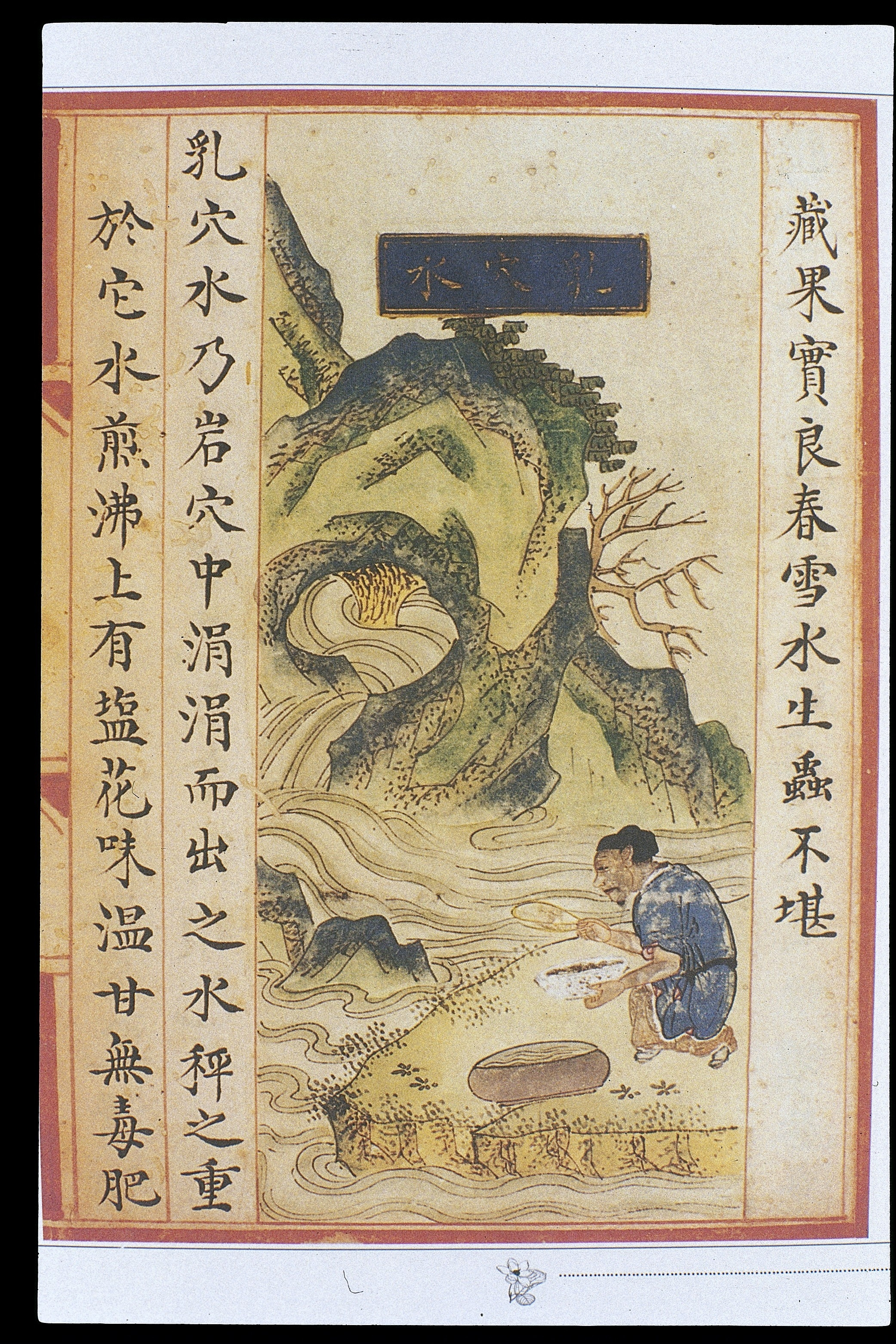
An image within a herbal diatetic text from the Ming dynasty. The image is of a person drinking water from a Limestone cave to improve their health.

The use of herbal tonics extends as far back as ancient times – embedded within traditional Chinese Medicine which categorised tonic herbs to ‘Jing’, ‘Qi’ and ‘Shen’ (which can be translated to mind, body and soul.) Traditional Chinese medicine used herbal tonics mainly as a preventative means of medicine, to maintain overall wellness which is similar to how it is used in Ayurvedic and Unani practices. Traditional Chinese medicine link the taste of herbs with their medicinal properties, this process dates back as far as AD 581, during the Late Sui dynasty. Chinese literature denotes four different roles to drugs (which in this case are different herbs used in tonics) – the emperor, minister, assistant and envoy. This translates respectively to the principle drug, the associate drug, the adjuvant drug and the messenger drug. Not all herbal tonics include all four of these components. Having a mix of these balance out toxic qualities of some sole herbs.

Today, the use of tonic herbs in China has seen a resurgence. This is in part due to the high cost of modern pharmaceuticals as well as the communist government which came into power in China in 1949. This government pushed for a return to traditional Chinese medicine after modern medicine entered China and dominated hospitals and institutions there. It is now common practice for doctors in China to amalgamate functions of traditional herbal medicine with modern practices.

=== Ancient Circum-Mediterranean ===
One herbal tonic which dates back to ancient times is Lucerne. It was found in Persia by Emperor Darius in roughly 500 BC and was renowned for its fattening and energising abilities. Not only was it consumed by humans, but was also fed to cattle, and often horses during long journeys.

=== Early Modern Ages ===
Interestingly, it is believed liqueurs were created to ward off ageing for King Louis XIV in 17th century France. Sugar mixed with herbs known for mending particular ailments form heart tonics believed to maintain optimal functioning of the cardiovascular system.

=== Cold War ===
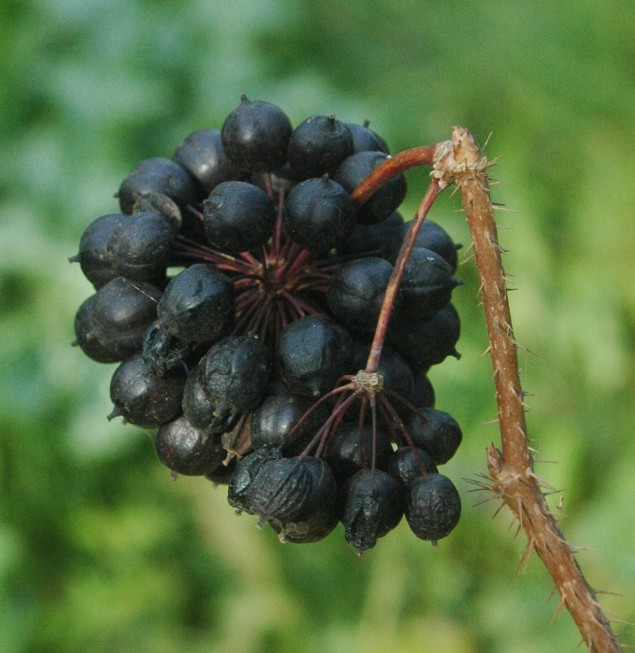
Eleutherococcus senticosus commonly known as Siberian Ginseng is one of the first plants defined as an adaptogen and used in herbal tonics in 1960 Soviet Russia.

Throughout modern history tonic herbs were continued to be used globally, entering new cultures and becoming common practice for some. The definition of adaptogens (a naturally occurring substance known to aid stress) was conceived in Soviet Russia during the Cold War. As a result of clinical studies proving the effectiveness of adaptogens (found in herbal tonics), they were formed into both tablets and concentrated liquids and distributed amongst army and military staff serving during the Cold War.

Adaptogens are believed to regulate the metabolism and increase resistance to stress, one example of an adaptogen is Eleutherococcus senticosus, more commonly referred to as Siberian ginseng. It was one of three plants involved in clinical pharmacological trials, and had statistically significant results in having stimulating and restoring effects. As a result of this, Siberian ginseng was used in both capsule and extract form.

== Uses ==
Herbal tonics are used in many different cases for many different reasons including the treatment of psychological, physical, and spiritual conditions.

People who consume herbal tonics often do so in pursuit of preventing illness and maintaining optimal health. Herbal tonics are also sometimes used similarly to coffee for a purported stimulating or calming effect in time of stress. Additionally, herbal tonics are used for physiological relief – to aid muscle pain, soothe tension headaches and alleviate unsettled stomachs, to name a few.

One example of a herbal tonic is raspberry leaf (Rubus idaeus) used by pregnant women. This herb has been used since traditional Chinese medicine, and is still popular in China, Europe and North America. Raspberry leaf is used due to a belief that it has no toxic connotations, nor is a medicinal substance, and has nutrients believed to tone the uterus. This is purportedly due to vitamins A, B, C and E found in the herb, these vitamins contain tannins and polypeptides, capable of stimulating and soothing. Studies have shown neither benefit nor harm from raspberry leaf during pregnancy.

== Health claims ==
=== Health and wellness benefits ===
Some herbal tonics have been used for treatment or prevention specific ailments. However, they are not considered a treatment or prevention by the US Food and Drug Administration and thus are not labeled or regulated as such in the United States.

Adaptogens are present in some herbal tonics, which are purported to improve wellbeing. The first discovered adaptogen was dibazol, in 1947 by Russian pharmacologist Nikolay Vasilievich Lazarev. Dibazol positively affected animals’ resistance against stress

Jacob's ladder (Polemonium ceruleum) is another herb used in tonics originally called chilodynamia by ancient Greeks. It was used to cure the vapours (hysteria and other cases of a patient losing mental focus), and still is used today to assist individuals experiencing hysteria though most physicians do not accept hysteria as a valid medical diagnosis.

=== Adverse effects ===
Reports of adverse effects regarding herbal tonics are at a minimum, largely because they are not treated as regulated pharmaceuticals. Instead, herbal tonics are predominantly marketed as dietary products; this means there are fewer regulations (and consequent studies) on the product before it is released to the general public for consumption.

Thus, the detriments of consuming herbal tonics are largely unknown to the greater population; further, there is an assumption herbal remedies and medicines are safe.

There are accounts of toxicity as a result of consuming herbal tonics causing severe abdominal pain, malaise and in some cases, even liver failure. These adverse effects exist as there is very little monitoring of the frequency herbal tonics are ingested by individuals leading to toxicity and chronic toxicity.

== See also ==
- Adaptogen
- Herbal extract
- Patent medicine
