= Bishop score =

Score to assess whether induction of labor will be required

- Synonyms: Cervix score
- Purpose: pre-labor scoring system to assist in predicting whether induction of labor will be required

Bishop score, also Bishop's score or cervix score, is a pre-labor scoring system to assist in predicting whether induction of labor will be required. It has also been used to assess the likelihood of spontaneous preterm delivery. The Bishop score was developed by Edward Bishop and was first published in August 1964.

== Components ==
The total score is calculated by assessing the following five components on manual vaginal examination by a trained professional:

- Cervical dilation in centimeters
- Cervical effacement as a percentage
- Cervical consistency by provider assessment/judgement
- Cervical position
- Fetal station, the position of the top of the fetal head in relation to the pelvic bones, specifically the ischial spines.

The Bishop score grades patients who would be most likely to achieve a successful induction. The duration of labor is inversely correlated with the Bishop score; “A Bishop score of 9 conveys a high likelihood for a successful induction. For research purposes, a Bishop score of 4 or less identifies an unfavorable cervix and may be an indication for cervical ripening.”

They can be remembered with the mnemonic: Call PEDS For Parturition = Cervical Position, Effacement, Dilation, Softness; Fetal Station.

== Scoring ==
The examiner assigns a score to each component of 0 to 2 or 0 to 3. The highest possible score is 13 and the lowest possible score is 0.

Bishop score
Parameter	Score				Description
Parameter	0	1	2	3	Description
Cervical position	Posterior	Middle	Anterior	–	The position of the cervix changes with menstrual cycles and also tends to become more anterior (nearer the opening of the vagina) as labour becomes closer.
Cervical consistency	Firm	Medium	Soft	–	In primigravid women, the cervix is typically tougher and resistant to stretching, much like a balloon that has not been previously inflated (it feels like the bottom of a chin). With subsequent vaginal deliveries, the cervix becomes less rigid and allows for easier dilation at term.
Cervical effacement	0-30%	40-50%	60-70%	80+%	Effacement translates to how 'thin' the cervix is. The cervix is normally approximately three centimetres long, as it prepares for labour and labour continues the cervix will efface until it is 'fully effaced' (paper-thin).
Cervical dilation	Closed	1–2 cm	3–4 cm	5+ cm	Dilation is a measure of how open the cervical os is. It is usually the most important indicator of progression through the first stage of labour. Dilation is measured by way of a digital cervical exam with the care providers fingers. Dilation is described using centimetres; closed, 1 cm, 2 cm, 3 cm, etc until fully dilated at 10 cm.
Fetal station	−3	−2	−1, 0	+1, +2	Fetal station describes the position of the fetus's head in relation to the distance from the ischial spines, which are approximately 3-4 centimetres inside the vagina and are not usually felt. Health professionals visualise where these spines are and use them as a reference point. Negative numbers indicate that the head is further inside than the ischial spines and positive numbers show that the head is below the level of the ischial spines.

== Interpretation ==
A score of 5 or less suggests that labour is unlikely to start on its own during the next few days. A score of 9 or more indicates that labour will most likely commence spontaneously in the next few days. Scores between 5 and 9 require additional consideration and professional judgement for clinical management.

A Bishop's score 6 or less often indicates that induction (e.g., with controlled-release prostaglandin E2/prostin gel [Cervidil], intravaginal gel [Prostin], intracervical gel [Prepidil]) is unlikely to be successful. Some sources indicate that only a score of 8 or greater is reliably predictive of a successful induction.

The score can be recalculated as the pregnancy progresses.

== Modified Bishop score ==
According to the Modified Bishop's pre-induction cervical scoring system, effacement has been replaced by cervical length in cm, with scores as follows: 0 for >3 cm, 1 for >2 cm, 2 for >1 cm, 3 for >0 cm. Cervical length may be easier and more accurate to measure and have less inter-examiner variability.

Another modification for the Bishop's score is the modifiers. Points are added or subtracted according to special circumstances as follows:

- One point is added to the total score for:
  - Existence of pre-eclampsia
  - Each previous delivery
- One point is subtracted from the total score for:
  - Postdate/post-term pregnancy
  - Nulliparity (no previous vaginal deliveries)
  - PPROM; preterm premature (prelabor) rupture of membranes

== See also ==
- List of obstetric topics
- Fetal fibronectin (fFN)
- Apgar score
