= Bloody show =

Bloody mucus discharge leading up to labour

Bloody show or show is the passage of a small amount of blood or blood-tinged mucus through the vagina near the end of pregnancy. It is caused by thinning and dilation of the cervix, leading to detachment of the cervical mucus plug that seals the cervix during pregnancy and tearing of small cervical blood vessels, and is one of the signs that labor may be imminent. The bloody show may be expelled from the vagina in pieces or altogether and often appears as a jelly-like piece of mucus stained with blood. Although the bloody show may be alarming at first, it is not a concern for patient health after 37 weeks of gestation.

== Signs and symptoms ==
Bloody show is recognized through the presence of mucus and blood that is combined and discharged from the cervix before labor occurs. Bloody show is sometimes used as an indication of active labor, and can occur as a result of the onset of labor. Bloody show can also occur with other symptoms of onset of labor, including painful contractions, degree of cervical effacement, and/or spontaneous membrane rupture. Severity of symptoms differs from person to person, and usually those symptoms are more commonly found than bloody show.

Bloody show may occur before labor, sometimes as early as three days before the actual delivery date. When a bloody show occurs, pregnant individuals are encouraged to see a midwife or doctor, as this may be an indication of active labor. Bloody show may occur gradually or all at once, however, it will indicate the pregnant person will go into labor soon.

Bloody show is the most common cause of bleeding during late pregnancy and often presents as minor bleeding mixed with mucus alongside other signs of labor initiation (contractions, cervical dilation, cervical effacement). While not considered as serious bleeding or deadly, the passage of a bloody show signals that labor is beginning or will begin soon.

== Diagnosis ==
The diagnostic examinations and tools used to determine the type of vaginal bleeding depend on a combination of gestation age, history of pregnancy and bleeding, past medical history, physical examination, and laboratory work.

- History of current pregnancy – estimated due date, risk factors for complications, abdominal pain, uterine contractions
- History of previous pregnancies – number of confirmed pregnancies, number of late-term deliveries, number of abortions, risk factors for major bleeding (e.g. prior cesarean section)
- Character of the bleeding – color, appearance, onset time, presence of pain
- Physical examination – vital signs (including blood pressure), abdominal palpitation, speculum or digital cervical examination
- Ultrasound and/or magnetic resonance imaging – assessment of uterus location and shape
- Laboratory tests - complete blood count, coagulation tests

=== Differential diagnoses ===
Vaginal bleeding may occur at any point during pregnancy. During late pregnancy, bleeding may be normal but may also indicate a more serious underlying problem such as miscarriage, placenta previa, or placental abruption. Bloody show itself is an exclusionary diagnosis, that is, it rules out other causes of vaginal bleeding. Other causes of vaginal bleeding in late pregnancy include placental abruption, placenta previa, vasa previa, uterine rupture, and non-obstetric causes.

While bloody show is not considered as vaginal bleeding requiring medical intervention, other more serious types of bleeding may visibly present as minor bleeding. As such, if any of the following are observed, a more thorough examination is warranted to rule out serious causes of bleeding:

- Maternal hypotension
- Tense and/or tender uterus
- Fetal distress - deceleration, bradycardia, loss of heart sounds
- Cessation of labor and/or inability of the uterus to contract

== Management ==
Bloody show is not considered abnormal within the context of pregnancy; therefore, no treatment is required.

If a bloody show occurs too early during a pregnancy, there are a few options to counteract the increased risk of infection and premature labor. Preterm labor occurs when the cervix opens after week 20 of pregnancy and before week 37. These options include de-stressing such as bed rest, avoiding intense activities, monitoring for signs of active labor, and stitching the cervix closed. Sometimes, the cervix will be stitched closed to help prevent infection or pathogenic harm to the fetus while it develops. Management of the beginning of labor, after the bloody show, can include breathing techniques and hydration to maintain relaxation before delivering the baby.

== Mechanism ==
Labor begins with the suppression of the inhibitory effects on myometrium contraction, leading to dilation of the cervix and pushing the fetus through the birth canal. This occurs as intrauterine biochemical events lead to the softening and dilation of the cervix. Decidual cells, which play a nutritional role in the formation of the placenta, promote the synthesis and release of prostaglandins and proinflammatory cytokines. Prostaglandins are key in the onset of childbirth, as they synchronize uterine activation and cervical ripening. In some pregnant individuals, hemorrhaging of blood vessels in the cervix may lead to a premature release of prostaglandins. Alongside prostaglandin, placental oxytocin is another key naturally occurring neuropeptide released at the onset of labor. Oxytocin can induce myometrial contractions, as it is a common tool used for the augmentation of contractions after the onset of labor.

Cyclic nucleotides, including cyclic guanosine monophosphate (cGMP) and cyclic adenosine monophosphate (cAMP), activate specific protein kinases to provide rapid intracellular responses to these neuropeptides. Cyclic GMP mediates nitric oxide in the myometrium, allowing the relaxation of the uterus. Cyclic AMP influences the relaxation of myometrial smooth muscle by complexing with adenylyl cyclase (ADCY), protein kinase A (PKA), and phosphodiesterases.

Through this biochemical cascade, a pregnant individual is prepared for childbearing. Vaginal mucus, or vaginal discharge, may increase in quantity as pregnancy progresses. While vaginal mucus is considered normal in individuals with female genitalia, pregnant individuals may notice streaks of blood or a red hue in their vaginal mucus. As the cervix effaces and dilates in preparation for childbearing, small blood vessels in the cervix may tear and bleed, leading to blood mixed with vaginal mucus from the displaced mucus plug. The mucus plug is a blockage of the cervix made up of mucus which acts as a physical barrier against infectious agents that may cause bacterial vaginosis or harm to the fetus. It also contains many antimicrobial agents, similar to the mucus found in the human nasal cavity. The mucus plug develops during pregnancy to provide a pathogen-free uterus to house the fetus. When a mucus plug detaches, a bloody show can be initiated. As the blood vessels in the cervix dilate, this leads to ruptures of membranes that allow blood and amniotic fluid to gather in the posterior vaginal canal.

== Epidemiology ==
Although the bloody show can occur as part of the natural progression of labor, activities such as sexual intercourse, pressure on the pelvis, or trauma can initiate the occurrence of bloody show and labor. Risk factors that can increase the chance of preterm labor and of having a bloody show include preeclampsia and birth complications that risk the health of the mother or fetus. Risk factors for preterm pregnancy such as high blood pressure, blood clotting issues, diabetes, sexually transmitted infections, or other vaginal infections may also put the mother at a high risk of an early bloody show.

== History ==
Bloody show was first mentioned in an article back in 1995.

== See also ==
- Antepartum hemorrhage
- Obstetrical hemorrhage
