= P63 =

P63 may refer to:

== Vessels ==
- HMS Unswerving (P63), a submarine of the Royal Navy
- INS Kulish (P63), a corvette of the Indian Navy
- LÉ William Butler Yeats (P63), an offshore patrol vessel of the Irish Naval Service

== Other uses ==
- Bell P-63 Kingcobra, an American fighter aircraft
- BMW P63, an automobile engine
- Papyrus 63, a biblical manuscript
- TP63, tumor protein p63
- P63, a state regional road in Latvia
- P6_{3}, three-dimensional space group number 173
