= Subhash Shirodkar =

Indian politician (born 1952)

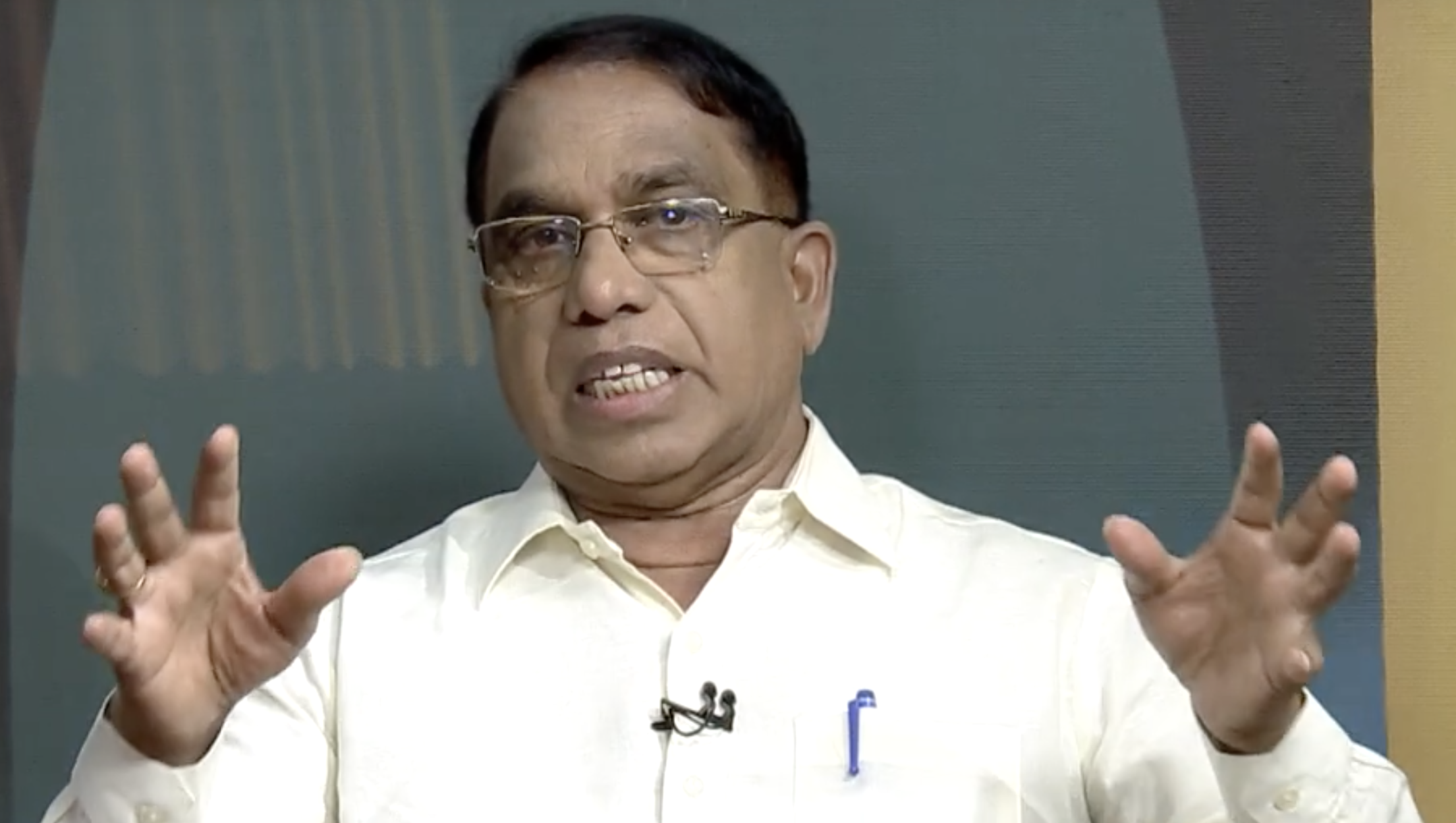
- Shirodkar in 2022

Member of the Goa Legislative Assembly
- In office 1984–2007
- Preceded by: Ramchandra Prabhu
- Succeeded by: Mahadev Naik
- Constituency: Shiroda
- Incumbent
- Assumed office 2017
- Preceded by: Mahadev Naik
- Constituency: Shiroda

Cabinet Minister, Government of Goa
- In office 14 September 1999 – 24 October 2000

Personal details
- Born: February 22, 1952 (age 74) Shiroda, Goa, Portuguese India
- Party: Bharatiya Janata Party (since 2018)
- Other political affiliations: Indian National Congress (1984–2018)
- Education: B.A., B.Ed.
- Alma mater: Chowgule College, Margao
- Occupation: Politician
- Profession: Teacher

Subhash Ankush Shirodkar (born 22 February 1952) is an Indian politician who is an eight-time member of the Goa Legislative Assembly, representing the Shiroda Assembly constituency.

== Career ==
=== Member of the Legislative Assembly ===
Shirodkar served as the sarpanch of the Shiroda Gram Panchayat from 1978 to 1984. He was elected to the Goa, Daman, and Diu Legislative Assembly in the 1984 Assembly Elections from the Shiroda constituency as a candidate of the Indian National Congress. Shirodkar successfully contested the 1989 Goa Legislative Assembly elections from the Shiroda constituency as a candidate of the Indian National Congress. He also won the Goa Legislative Assembly elections of 1994, 1999 and 2002 from the Shiroda constituency as a candidate of the Indian National Congress.

Subhash Shirodkar lost the 2007 Goa Legislative Assembly election from the Shiroda constituency to Mahadev Naik of the Bharatiya Janata Party. Shirodkar contested the 2012 Goa Legislative Assembly election from the Siroda constituency as the Indian National Congress party's candidate, but lost to Mahadev Naik of the Bharatiya Janata Party.

Shirodkar returned to the Goa Legislative Assembly as an Indian National Congress candidate by defeating Mahadev Naik of the Bharatiya Janata Party in the 2012 Goa Legislative Assembly election. Shirodkar quit the Indian National Congress on 16 October 2018 and resigned as the Member of the Legislative Assembly, to join the Bharatiya Janata Party.

=== Cabinet Minister ===
Shirodkar was a Cabinet Minister in the Government of Goa headed by Pratapsingh Rane from 1985 to 1989 and held the portfolios of Information, Agriculture, Animal Husbandry & Veterinary Services, Forests, Cooperation and Town & Country Planning. He also served as a Cabinet Minister in the Ravi Naik Ministry from 19 June 1991 to 18 May 1993 and in the Wilfred de Souza Ministry from 18 May 1993 to March 1994, where he held the portfolios of Education, Art & Culture, Information & Technology, Sports & Youth Affairs and Inland Waterways.

He served as a Cabinet Minister in the Pratapsingh Rane Ministry from 16 December 1994 to 29 July 1998 and in the Wilfred de Souza Ministry from 29 July 1998 to 22 November 1998 and held the portfolios of Industries, Urban Development and Information. From 30 November 1998 to 8 February 1999, Shirodkar was a Cabinet Minister in the Luizinho Faleiro Ministry and held the portfolios of Public Works Department, Industries and Printing & Stationery.

Shirodkar served as the Cabinet Minister in the second Luizinho Faleiro from 14 September 1999 to 24 November 1999 and was entrusted with the portfolios of Urban Development, Education, Archives & Archaeology, Museum & Gazetteers and Official Language. He was also a Cabinet Minister in the Francisco Sardinha Ministry from 24 November 1999 to 20 October 2000 with the portfolios of Public Works Department, Mining and Information.

=== Other offices held ===
Shirodkar also served as the President of the Goa Pradesh Congress Committee from September 2008 to 2013. He is a former Chairman of the All Goa Kabaddi Association and the former President of the Goa Olympic Association.

He is the Chairman of the Shivgram Education Society, which manages various educational institutions in Shiroda, Goa. The Shivgram Education Society manages the Shree Rayeshwar Institute of Engineering and Information Technology, Shri Kamaxshi Devi Homeopathic Medical College & Hospital, Shiroda Higher Secondary School, Shri Brahmadurga High School, School of Symbiosis and the Daffodils Primary School.

On 31 October 2018, Shirodkar was appointed the Chairman of the Economic Development Corporation (EDC), a financial institution of the Government of Goa.
