= Vithal Nagesh Shirodkar =

Indian gynaecologist (1899–1971)

- Portrait of Shirodkar
- Born: 27 April 1899; Shiroda, Portuguese Goa
- Died: 7 March 1971 (aged 71)
- Education: Grant Medical College
- Known for: Shirodkar cerclage
- Awards: Padma Bhushan (1960); Padma Vibhushan (1971)
- Scientific career
- Fields: Medicine

V. N. Shirodkar or Vithal Nagesh Shirodkar (27 April 1899 – 7 March 1971) was an Indian obstetrician and gynaecologist, hailing from the State of Goa.

== Biography ==
Shirodkar was born in Shiroda, Goa. He belonged to the Kalawantin community (now known as Gomantak Maratha Samaj in Goa). After he graduated from Grant Medical College, he went to the United Kingdom and obtained a Fellowship of the Royal College of Surgeons in 1931. He was associated with Professor J. Chassar Moir, Victor Lack, and J.D. Murdoch.

He returned to India and joined the J.J. Group of Hospitals in 1935 as Honorary Obstetrician and Gynecologist. His most widely known contribution is a type of cervical cerclage called the "Shirodkar cerclage". His other contributions include operations for prolapse repair, tuboplasty and creation of a neovagina. He published widely and took a keen interest in social medicine.

He was a member of the Shantilal Shah Committee on Abortions and also established the Family Planning Association of India. The government of India awarded him the Padma Bhushan in 1960 and the Padma Vibhushan in 1971.

== Shirodkar Cerclage ==
A Shirodkar cerclage is similar to the standard cervical cerclage, but the sutures pass through the walls of the cervix so they are not exposed. It is less common and more technically difficult than a McDonald, and is thought (although not proven) to reduce the risk of infection. The Shirodkar procedure sometimes involves a permanent stitch around the cervix which will not be removed and therefore a Caesarean section will be necessary to deliver the baby. The Shirodkar technique was first described by Dr. Shirodkar in Bombay in 1955.
