= Shiroda, Goa =

Shiroda
- Village
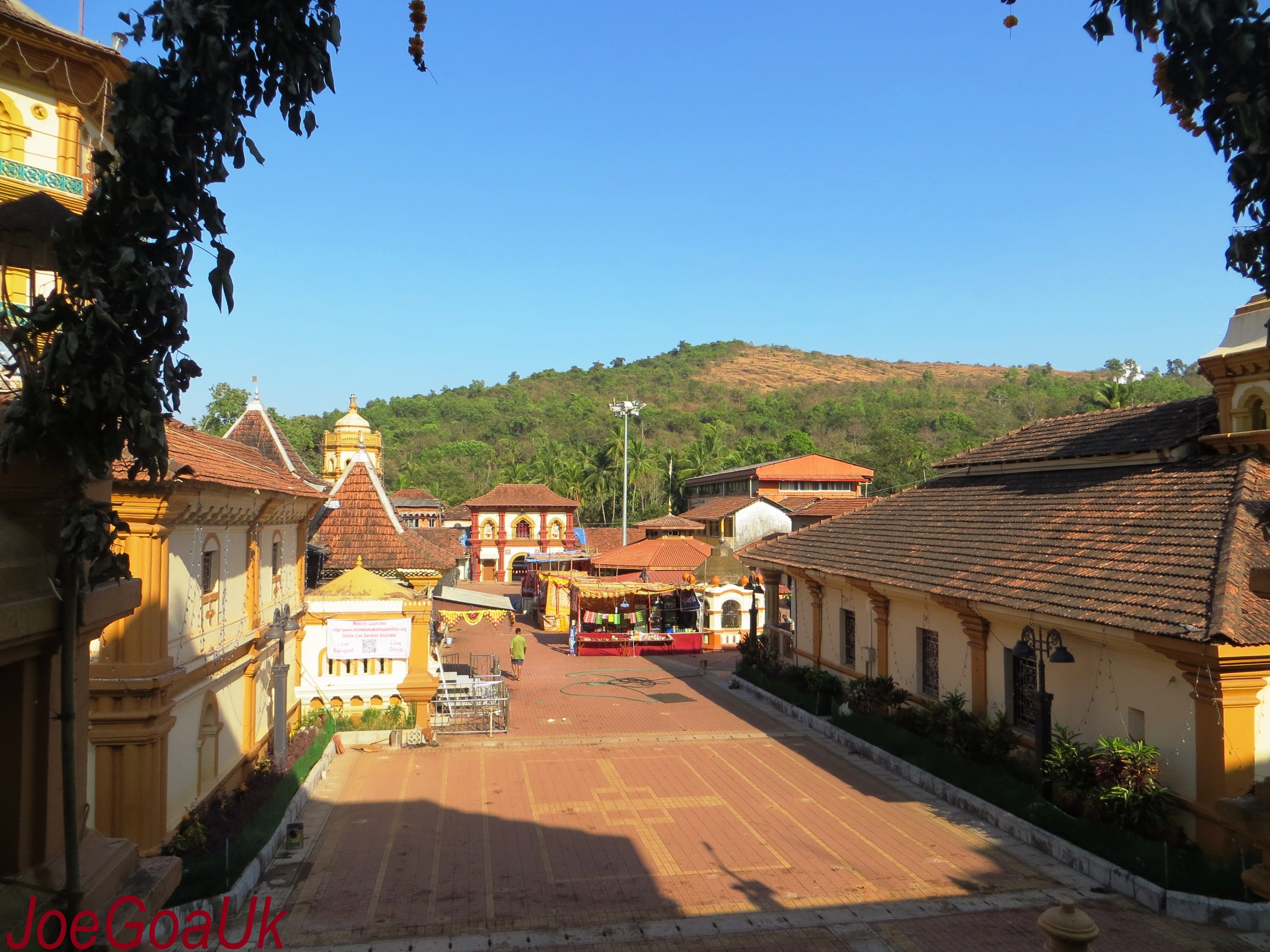
- Way to the Kamakshi Temple, 2014

- Location within Goa Location within India
- Coordinates: 15°19′45″N 74°01′38″E
- Country: India
- State: Goa
- District: South Goa
- Taluka: Ponda

Area
  - Total: 3.15 km^{2} (1.22 sq mi)
- Elevation: 9 m (30 ft)

Population (2001)
  - Total: 14,112
  - Density: 4,457/km^{2} (11,540/sq mi)
- Time zone: UTC+5:30 (IST)
- Postcode: 403103
- Area code: 08343

Shiroda is a village in Ponda Taluka in South Goa District, Goa, India. The village has a population of 14,112 (Male: 6,928 Female: 7,184) based on 2001 census data.

== Location ==
A 13-km drive from Ponda brings you into Shiroda. It is located 36 kilometres east of the state capital Panaji, via NH4A. The village is bordered by the Zuari river on side and the villages of Bethora, Panchawadi, Nirankal and Borim on the other.

== Education ==
Shiroda houses one of the engineering colleges of Goa, Shree Rayeshwar Institute of Engineering and Information Technology and two colleges of Alternative medicine, the Gomantak Ayurved Mahavidyalaya & Research Centre and Shri Kamaxshi Devi Homeopathic Medical College & Hospital. There are 20 govt primary schools one middle school 7 high schools and two higher secondary schools.

== History and religious importance ==
The name "Shiroda" is derived from "Shivanath", which translates to "Drawn from god".

Shiroda is very popular for its Kamakshi Temple. People visit this temple on Amavasya or New moon day of every month. Every year on the day of Shivaratri, a grand temple festival or zatra is held which is attended by thousands of devotees from Goa as well as Karnataka and Maharashtra. Other temples include Ravalnath (which is situated in Shiroda market) Mahamaya, Madhav, Veer Bhadra, Betal, Shivnath, Narayan Dev, Kelbai Sateri, Kshetrapal, Mahamaya, Brahma Durga, Bhagwati and Mandaleshwara. The village's oldest temple is Mandaleshwar, which was built in the eight century and houses the village deity (gram devta). Near the Madhav temple lies the holy place made of stone and mud, called Vato. It now lies in ruins. Besides, above gram devatas, there are temples of Maruti, Vithoba, Krishna, Satyanarayana, Laxminarayan, Siddhivinayak, Jalmi, Rama, and Shripad Shrivallabh.

Shiroda has a church situated in Karai, namely St. Joseph Church, which holds Goa's biggest Eucharistic cross.

Shiroda community celebrates Shigmo, Dhendlo, carnival, and Dasara which is a day later than whole Goa's Dasara festival. The Dasara starts at Betal Temple and then proceeds to Valpeshwar Temple and then to Ravalnath Temple.

== Demographics ==
According to the 2011 Census, Shiroda has a population of about 14,000, with 21% belonging to the Scheduled tribes and 2% to the Scheduled castes. About 38% of the population belongs to the working class. 88% of the population is literate.

== Attractions ==
- Shree Mandaleshwar Temple: The village's oldest temple, its zatra is held in November every year. The building was built in the 7th-8th century, and the courtyard, devoted to Shiva, displays the original dome of the temple.
- Shri Kamakshi Temple: Located in Thal Wada
- St Joseph's Church: Situated at Karai, it was built in 1782 and its feast is on 1 May.
- Shree Rayeshwar Institute of Engineering And Information Technology.
- Papal Cross: Goa's largest cross, it completed 25 years on 25 September 2016. It was built for an altar that hosted the holy mass by Pope John Paul II 6 February 1986.
- Ancestral House of Hedes: Named 'Macao', this 125-year-old structure is situated at Shenvi Wada. One of the village schools is named after Rajaram Hede's wife, Kamalabai.

== Notable residents ==
- Vithal Nagesh Shirodkar (1899–1971): This obstetrician and gynaecologist innovated with the technique called Cervical Cerclage or Shirodkar Cerclage.
- Shobha Gurtu: Popularised the Thumri genre. Menakabai Shirodkar, a singer and dancer, was her mother.
- Subhash Shirodkar: MLA of Shiroda constituency
- Sudesh Bhosle: Playback singer for Bollywood
- Dr Sakharam Gude, a popular doctor, whose work was well appreciated by villagers. Honoured with a Gomantbhushan award. A hospital is run in his name,
- Bhagvant Hede and Ratan Prabhudesai, noted artists.
- Dr Guruprasad Bakhake.
- Dr. Ramkrishna Tukaram Parkar and Dr. Shashi Ramkrishna Parkar: Notable and popular doctors whose work has been appreciated by villagers. They run a clinic which is the most popular in the village.
