= Papyrus 63 =

Papyrus 𝔓^{63}
- New Testament manuscript
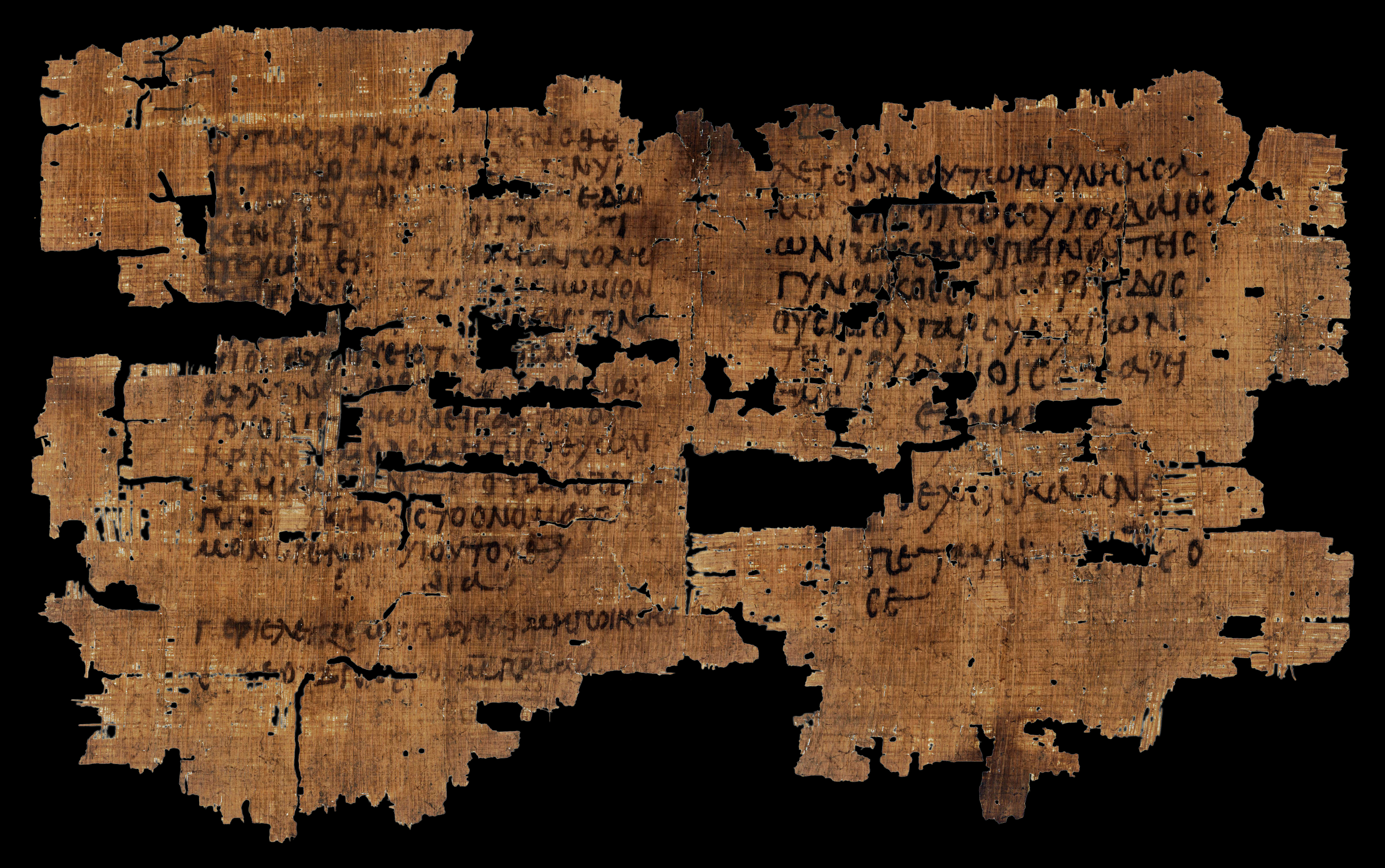
- Recto, John 3:16-18 (left) and 4:9 (right) both with commentary
- Text: Gospel of John 3; 4 †
- Date: ca. 500
- Script: Greek
- Found: Egypt
- Now at: Berlin State Museums
- Cite: O. Stegmüller, Zu den Bibelorakeln im Codex Bezae, Biblica 34 (1953), pp. 13-22.
- Size: 18.5 x 15 cm
- Type: Alexandrian text-type
- Category: II

Papyrus 63 (in the Gregory-Aland numbering), designated by 𝔓^{63}, is a copy of the New Testament in Greek. It is a papyrus manuscript of the Gospel of John. The surviving text of John are verses 3:14-18; 4:9-10. The manuscript paleographically had been assigned to the 4th century (or 5th century).

== Text ==
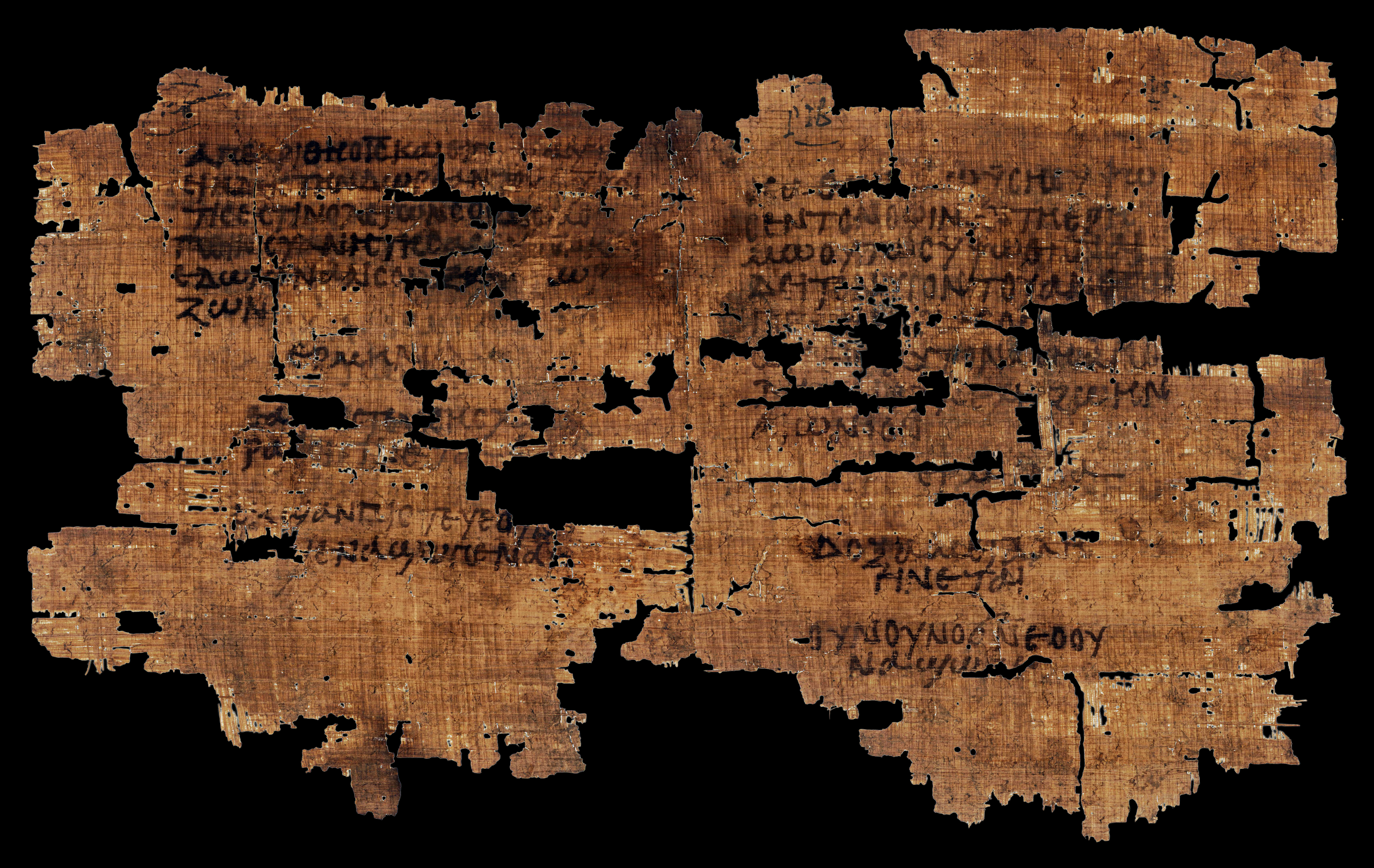
Verso, John 3:14-15 (right); 4:10 (left) both with commentary

The Greek text of this codex is a representative of the Alexandrian text-type, but with some the Byzantine readings. Aland placed it in Category II.

^{14} καθω̣ς̣ μ̣ωυσης υψωσεν τον οφιν ε̣ν̣ τη ερη̣μω ουτως υψωθηναι δει τον υιον του ανθ̣ρ̣ω̣πο̣υ̣ ^{15} ι̣ν̣[α] π̣α̣ς̣ ο̣ π̣[ιστευ]ω̣ν̣ ε̣ι̣ς̣ α̣υτον μ̣η απολη̣[τα]ι̣ α̣λ̣λ̣ εχ̣η̣ ζωην αιωνιον

^{16} ουτως γαρ ηγ̣απ̣η̣σεν ο θεο̣ς τον κοσμον ωσ̣τ̣[ε] τ̣ο̣ν υιο̣ν αυτου τον̣ μ̣ο̣ν̣[ο]γ̣ε̣ν̣η̣ εδωκεν εις τον̣ [κοσμ]ον ι̣να̣ ο̣ π̣ιστευων εις [αυ]τ̣ο̣ν̣ μ̣η αποληται α̣λ̣λ εχ̣η̣ ζω̣[ην] α̣ιωνιον ^{17} ο̣υ̣ γ̣α̣ρ̣ [α]π̣[εσ]τ̣[ειλε]ν̣ ο̣ θ̣εος τ̣ον υιον̣ αυτ̣ου εις το̣[ν] [κ]ο̣σμ[ον] αλλ ινα σ̣ωθ̣η̣ [ο] κοσ̣μ̣ο̣ς̣ δ̣ι αυτου ^{18} ο πιστ̣ε̣υ̣ων εις αυ̣τον ου̣ κρινετ̣α̣ι̣ ο δ̣ε μη πιστευων ηδ̣η και κ̣ρ̣[ι]νεται̣ οτι μη πε̣πιστ̣[ε]υ̣κεν ε̣ις το ονομα το̣υ̣ μονογενου̣ς̣ υιου του θυ̅

In John 3:16 it has the textual variant υιον αυτου supported by the manuscript's second corrector of Sinaiticus (א^{2}), A, L, Θ, Ψ, 063, 083, 086, 0113, f^{1}, f^{13}, Byz, Didache.

== Location ==
The codex is currently housed at the Staatliche Museen zu Berlin (Inv. 11914) in Berlin.

== See also ==
- John 3, John 4
- List of New Testament papyri
