= Red raspberry leaf =

Herbal drug

The red raspberry leaf (Rubus idaeus), also known as garden raspberry leaf, is produced by the deciduous raspberry plant and used in folk remedies.

== Use in pregnancy ==
Traditional lore suggests that pregnant women use raspberry leaf tea, especially as an aid in delivery. However, scientific research has found little to no evidence to support this claim. Most of the evidence available is anecdotal, and a 2009 review article stressed concern at the lack of evidence for safety and efficacy and called recommendations of its use "questionable".
