= Cervix =

Lower part of the uterus in the female reproductive system

Uterine cervix
- Human cervix

- Diagram of the female human reproductive tract

Details
- Precursor: Paramesonephric ducts
- Artery: Vaginal artery and uterine artery

Identifiers
- Latin: cervix uteri
- MeSH: D002584
- TA98: A09.1.03.010
- TA2: 3508
- FMA: 17740

The cervix (Note: Pronounced /ˈsɜːrvɪks/, SUR-viks) (pl.: cervices) or uterine cervix (Latin: cervix uteri) is a dynamic fibromuscular sexual organ of the female reproductive system that connects the vagina with the uterine cavity. The human female cervix has been documented anatomically since at least the time of Hippocrates, over 2,000 years ago. The cervix is approximately 4 cm (1.6 in) long with a diameter of approximately 3 cm (1.2 in) and tends to be described as a cylindrical shape, although the front and back walls of the cervix are contiguous. The size of the cervix changes throughout a female's life cycle. For example, females in the fertile years of their reproductive cycle tend to have larger cervixes than postmenopausal females; likewise, females who have produced offspring have a larger cervix than those who have not.

In relation to the vagina, the part of the cervix that opens into the uterus is called the internal os while the opening of the cervix into the vagina is called the external os. Between those extremes is the conduit commonly called the cervical canal. The lower part of the cervix, known as the vaginal portion of the cervix (or ectocervix), bulges into the top of the vagina. The endocervix borders the uterus. The cervical conduit has at least two types of epithelium (lining): the endocervical lining is glandular epithelium that lines the endocervix with a single layer of column-shaped cells; while the ectocervical part of the conduit contains squamous epithelium. Squamous epithelia line the conduit with multiple layers of cells topped with flat cells. These two linings converge at the squamocolumnar junction (SCJ). This junction changes location dynamically throughout a female's life. The cervix is the organ that allows epithelia to flow from a female's uterus and out through their vagina at menstruation. Menstruation releases epithelia from a female’s uterus with every period of their fertile years, unless pregnancy occurs.

Several methods of contraception aim to prevent fertilization by blocking the conduit, including cervical caps and cervical diaphragms, preventing the passage of sperm through the cervix. Other approaches include methods that observe cervical mucus, such as the Creighton Model and Billings ovulation method. Cervical mucus's consistency changes during menstrual periods, which may signal ovulation.

During vaginal childbirth, the cervix must flatten and dilate to allow the foetus to progress along the birth canal. Midwives and doctors use the extent of cervical dilation to assist decision-making during childbirth.

Cervical infections with the human papillomavirus (HPV) can cause changes in the epithelium, which can lead to cancer of the cervix. Cervical cytology tests can detect cervical cancer and its precursors to enable early, successful treatment. Ways to avoid HPV include avoiding heterosexual sex, using penile condoms, and receiving the HPV vaccination. HPV vaccines, developed in the early 21st century, reduce the risk of developing cervical cancer by preventing infections from the main cancer-causing strains of HPV.

== Structure ==
Diagram of the uterus and part of the vagina. The cervix is the lower part of the uterus situated between the external os (external orifice) and the internal os (internal orifice). The cervical canal connects the interior of the vagina and the cavity of the body of the uterus.

The cervix is part of the female reproductive system. Around 2–3 centimetres (0.8–1.2 in) in length, it is the lower, narrower part of the uterus, continuous above with the broader upper part—or body—of the uterus. The lower end of the cervix bulges through the anterior wall of the vagina, and is referred to as the vaginal portion of the cervix (or ectocervix), while the rest of the cervix above the vagina is called the supravaginal portion of cervix. A central canal, known as the cervical canal, runs along its length and connects the cavity of the body of the uterus with the lumen of the vagina. The openings are known as the internal os and external orifice of the uterus (or external os), respectively. The mucosa lining the cervical canal is known as the endocervix, and the mucosa covering the ectocervix is known as the exocervix. The cervix has an inner mucosal layer, a thick layer of smooth muscle, and posteriorly the supravaginal portion has a serosal covering consisting of connective tissue and overlying peritoneum.

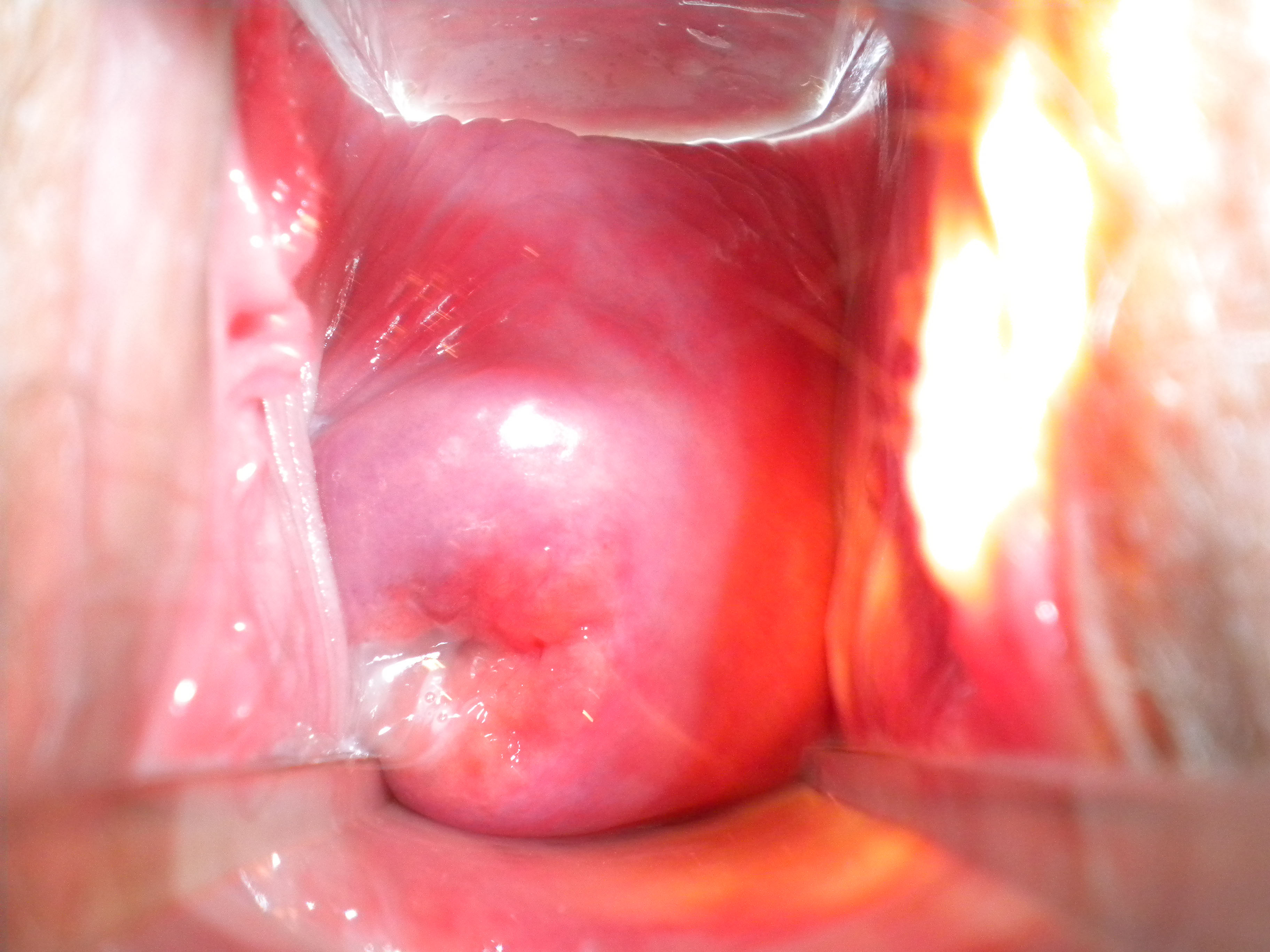
A normal cervix of an adult viewed through a vagina using a bivalved vaginal speculum. The functional squamocolumnar junction surrounds the external os and is visible as the irregular demarcation between the lighter and darker shades of pink mucosa.

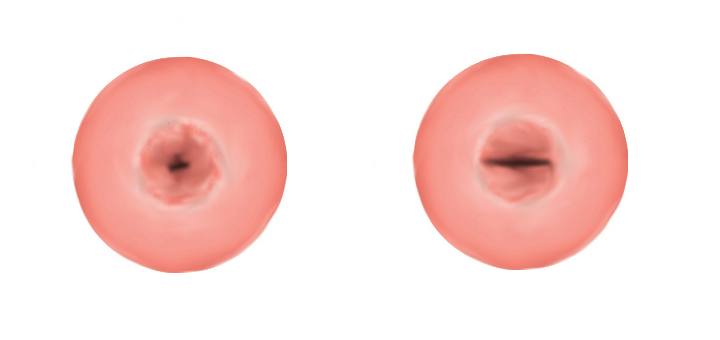
Cervix before (left) and after vaginal birth (right)

In front of the upper part of the cervix lies the bladder, separated from it by cellular connective tissue known as parametrium, which also extends over the sides of the cervix. To the rear, the supravaginal cervix is covered by peritoneum, which runs onto the back of the vaginal wall and then turns upwards and onto the rectum, forming the recto-uterine pouch. The cervix is more tightly connected to surrounding structures than the rest of the uterus.

The cervical canal varies greatly in length and width between women or throughout a woman's life, and it can measure 8 mm (0.3 inch) at its widest diameter in premenopausal adults. It is wider in the middle and narrower at each end. The anterior and posterior walls of the canal each have a vertical fold, from which ridges run diagonally upwards and laterally. These are known as palmate folds, due to their resemblance to a palm leaf. The anterior and posterior ridges are arranged so that they interlock with each other and close the canal. They are often effaced after pregnancy.

The ectocervix (also known as the vaginal portion of the cervix) has a convex, elliptical shape and projects into the cervix between the anterior and posterior vaginal fornices. On the rounded part of the ectocervix is a small, depressed external opening, connecting the cervix with the vagina. The size and shape of the ectocervix and the external opening (external os) can vary according to age, hormonal state, and whether childbirth has taken place. In women who have not had a vaginal delivery, the external opening is small and circular, and in women who have had a vaginal delivery, it is slit-like. On average, the ectocervix is 3 cm (1.2 in) long and 2.5 cm (1 in) wide.

Blood is supplied to the cervix by the descending branch of the uterine artery and drains into the uterine vein.

Sensory innervation of the cervix is conveyed through both visceral and somatic pathways. Visceral pain from the supravaginal portion of the cervix is transmitted via afferent fibers that travel with sympathetic nerves to spinal cord levels T10-L1 through the inferior hypogastric and uterovaginal plexuses. The vaginal portion of the cervix receives somatic sensory innervation via branches of the pudendal nerve (S2-S4). Parasympathetic fibers arising from the pelvic splanchnic nerves (S2-S4) contribute autonomic input via the inferior hypogastric plexus. These nerves travel along the uterosacral ligaments, which pass from the uterus to the anterior sacrum.

Three channels facilitate lymphatic drainage from the cervix. The anterior and lateral cervix drains to nodes along the uterine arteries, travelling along the cardinal ligaments at the base of the broad ligament to the external iliac lymph nodes and ultimately the paraaortic lymph nodes. The posterior and lateral cervix drains along the uterine arteries to the internal iliac lymph nodes and ultimately the paraaortic lymph nodes, and the posterior section of the cervix drains to the obturator and presacral lymph nodes. However, there are variations as lymphatic drainage from the cervix travels to different sets of pelvic nodes in some people. This has implications for scanning nodes for involvement in cervical cancer.

After menstruation and directly under the influence of estrogen, the cervix undergoes a series of changes in position and texture. During most of the menstrual cycle, the cervix remains firm and is positioned low and closed. However, as ovulation approaches, the cervix becomes softer and rises to open in response to the higher levels of estrogen present. These changes are also accompanied by changes in cervical mucus, described below.

=== Development ===
As a component of the female reproductive system, the cervix is derived from the two paramesonephric ducts (also called Müllerian ducts), which develop around the sixth week of embryogenesis. During development, the outer parts of the two ducts fuse, forming a single urogenital canal that will become the vagina, cervix, and uterus. The cervix grows in size at a smaller rate than the body of the uterus, so the relative size of the cervix over time decreases, decreasing from being much larger than the body of the uterus in fetal life, twice as large during childhood, and decreasing to its adult size, smaller than the uterus, after puberty. Previously, it was thought that during fetal development, the original squamous epithelium of the cervix is derived from the urogenital sinus, and the original columnar epithelium is derived from the paramesonephric duct. The point at which these two original epithelia meet is called the original squamocolumnar junction. New studies show, however, that all the cervical as well as large part of the vaginal epithelium are derived from Müllerian duct tissue and that phenotypic differences might be due to other causes.

=== Histology ===
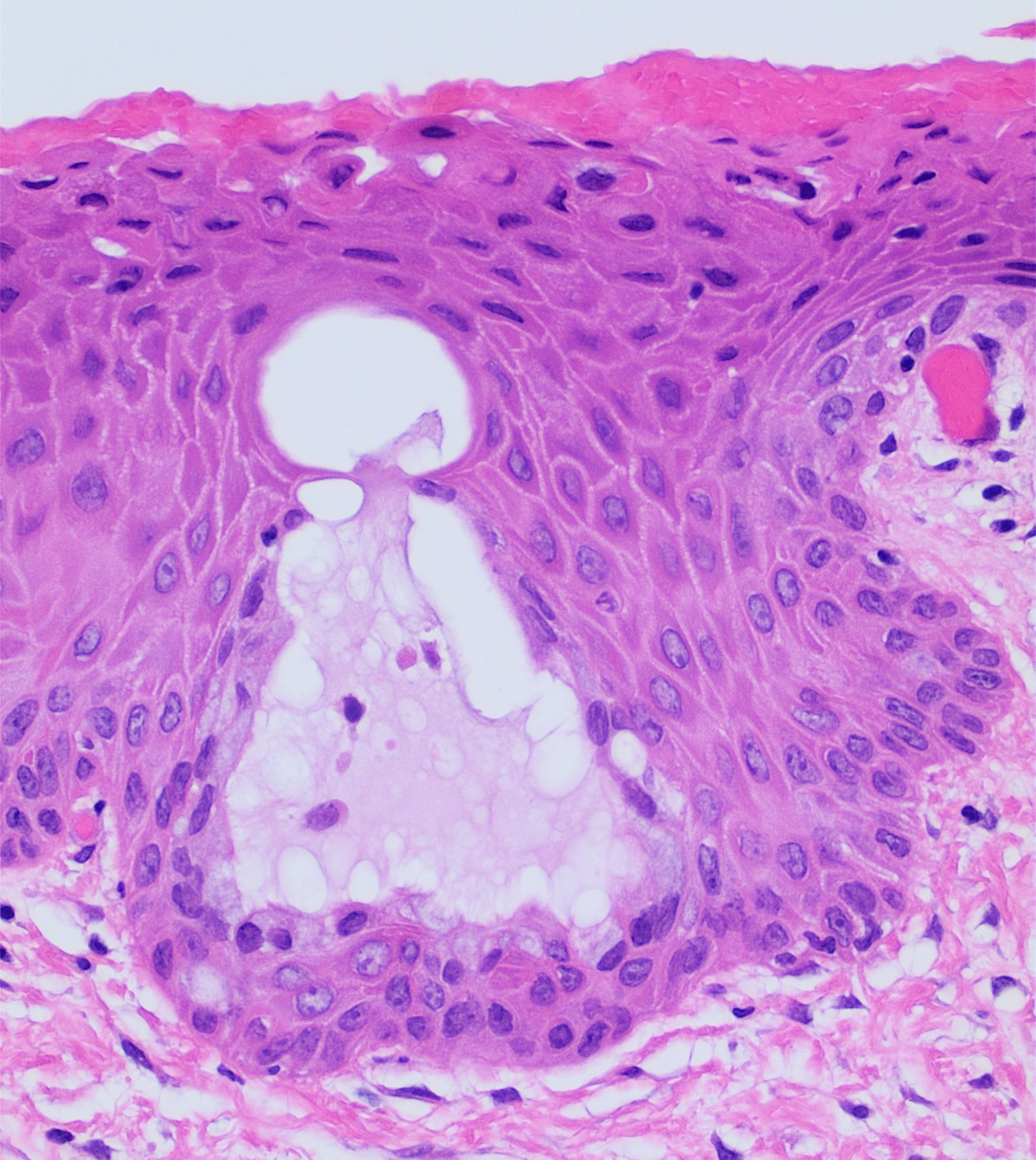
Transformation zone mucosa, when the squamocolumnar junction has a gradual transition. It consists of a mix of stratified squamous epithelium and mucinous glands. H&E stain.

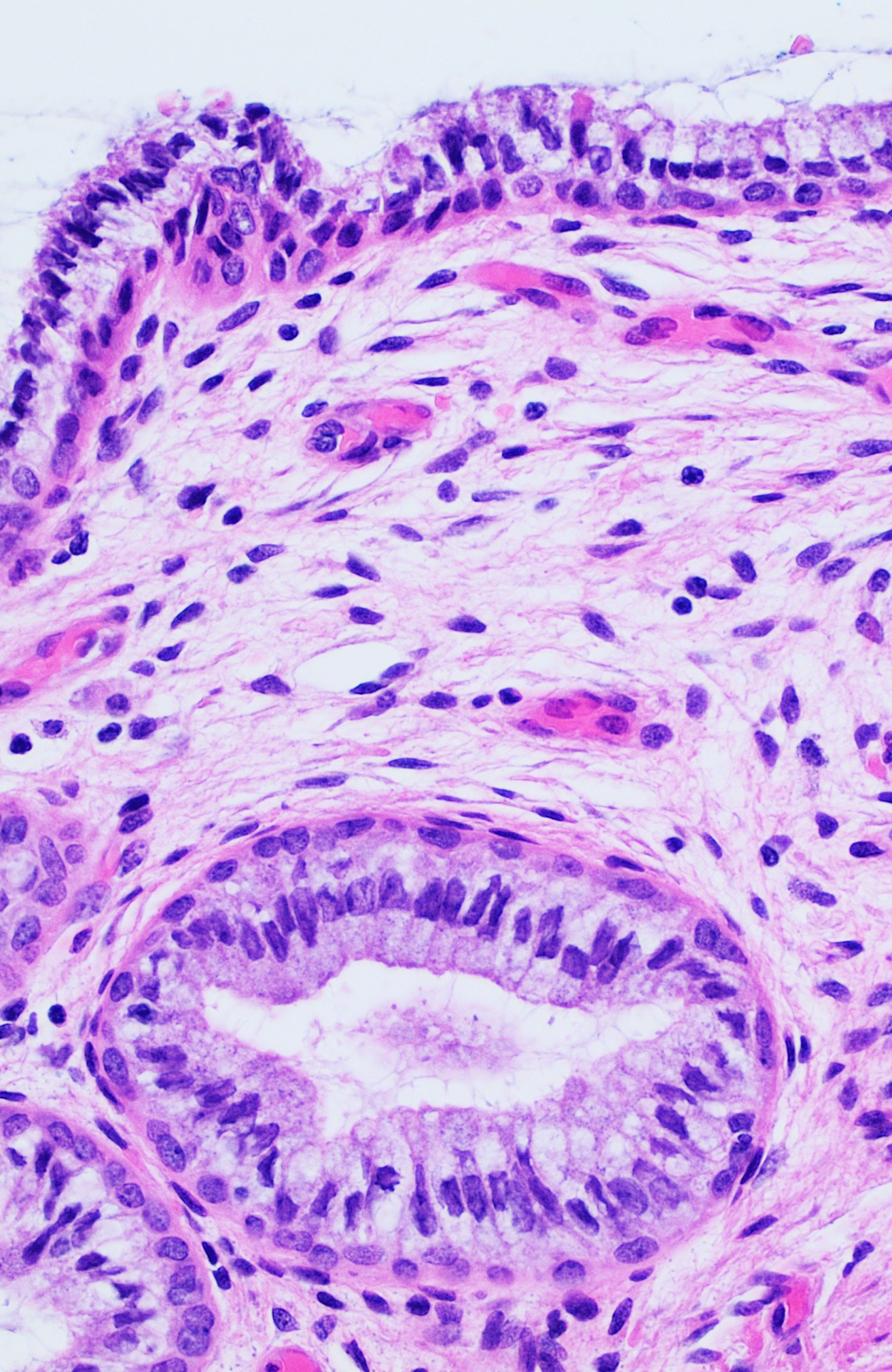
Histology of endocervix, with mucinous columnar epithelium and mucinous glands. H&E stain.

The endocervical mucosa is about 3 mm (0.12 in) thick and lined with a single layer of columnar mucous cells. It contains numerous tubular mucous glands, which empty viscous alkaline mucus into the lumen. In contrast, the ectocervix is covered with nonkeratinized stratified squamous epithelium, which resembles the squamous epithelium lining the vagina. The junction between these two types of epithelia is called the squamocolumnar junction. Underlying both types of epithelium is a tough layer of collagen. The mucosa of the endocervix is not shed during menstruation. The cervix has more fibrous tissue, including collagen and elastin, than the rest of the uterus.

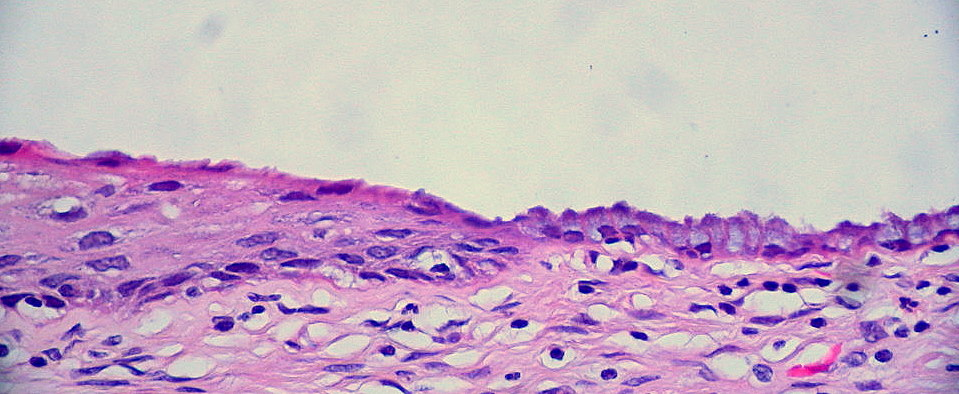
The squamocolumnar junction of the cervix, with abrupt transition: The ectocervix, with its stratified squamous epithelium, is visible on the left. Simple columnar epithelium, typical of the endocervix, is visible on the right. A layer of connective tissue is visible under both types of epithelium.

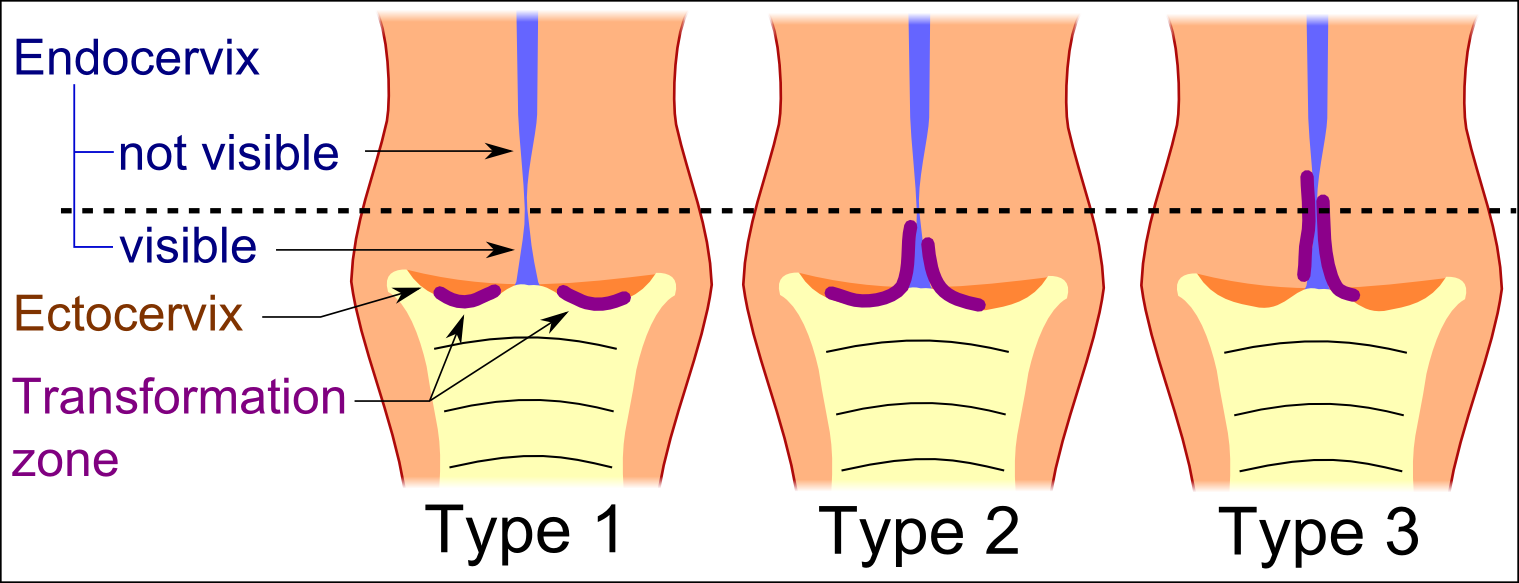
Transformation zone types:
Type 1: Completely ectocervical (common under hormonal influence).
Type 2: Endocervical component but fully visible (common before puberty).
Type 3: Endocervical component, not fully visible (common after menopause).

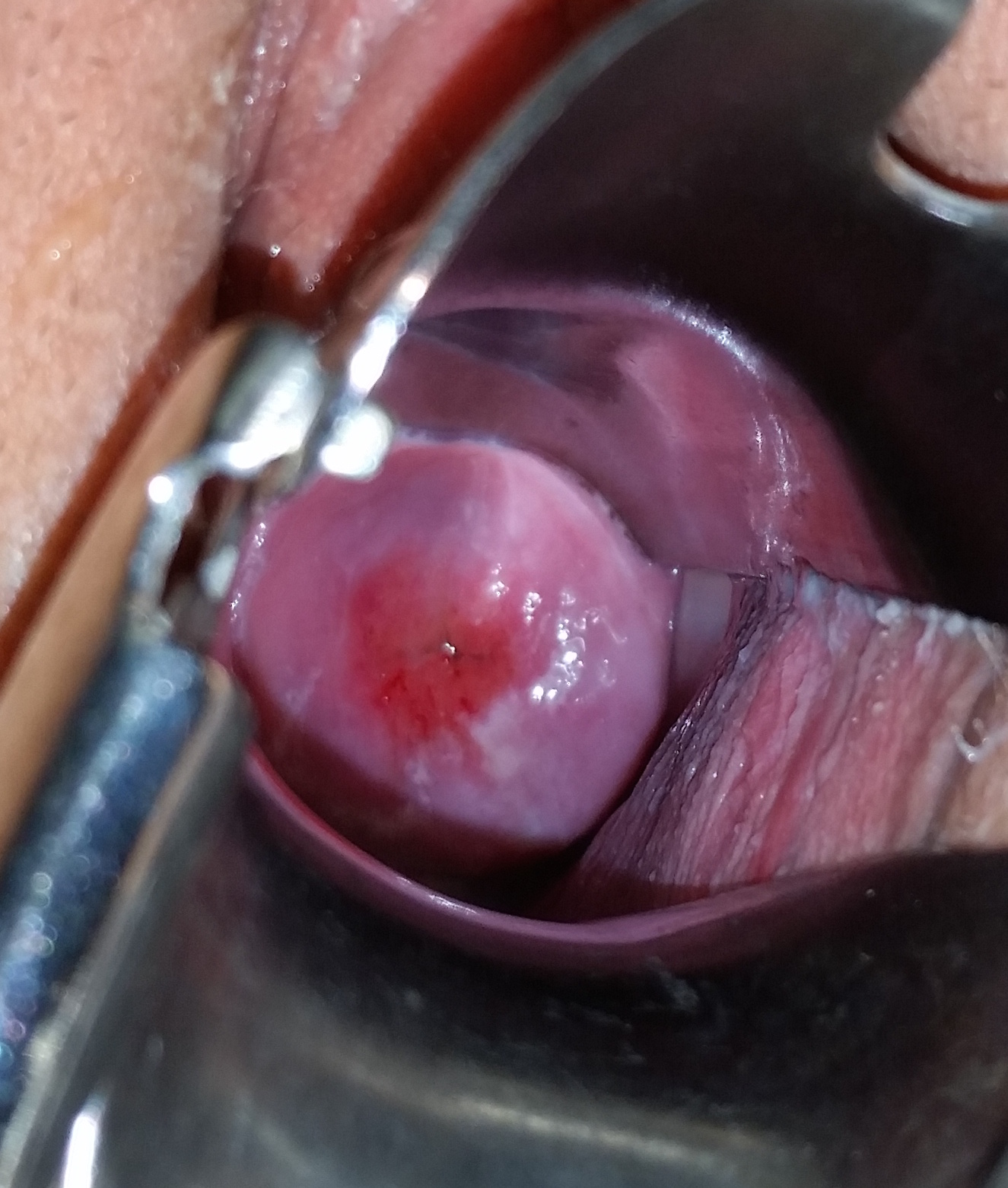
A nulliparous woman's ectocervix showing cervical ectropion, visible as the darker red mucosa surrounding the cervical os. Viewed on speculum exam.

Epithelial cell types of the cervix. Reserve cells occur beneath the columnar epithelium and may proliferate during squamous metaplasia.

In prepubertal girls, the functional squamocolumnar junction is just within the cervical canal. Upon entering puberty, due to hormonal influence, and during pregnancy, the columnar epithelium extends outward over the ectocervix as the cervix everts. Hence, this also causes the squamocolumnar junction to move outwards onto the vaginal portion of the cervix, where it is exposed to the acidic vaginal environment. The exposed columnar epithelium can undergo physiological metaplasia and change to tougher metaplastic squamous epithelium in days or weeks, which is very similar to the original squamous epithelium when mature. The new squamocolumnar junction is therefore internal to the original squamocolumnar junction, and the zone of unstable epithelium between the two junctions is called the transformation zone of the cervix. Histologically, the transformation zone is generally defined as surface squamous epithelium with surface columnar epithelium or stromal glands/crypts, or both.

After menopause, the uterine structures involute, and the functional squamocolumnar junction moves into the cervical canal.

Nabothian cysts (or Nabothian follicles) form in the transformation zone where the lining of metaplastic epithelium has replaced mucous epithelium and caused a strangulation of the outlet of some of the mucous glands. A buildup of mucus in the glands forms Nabothian cysts, usually less than about 5 mm (0.20 in) in diameter, which are considered physiological rather than pathological. Both gland openings and Nabothian cysts are helpful to identify the transformation zone.

== Functions ==
=== Fertility ===
The cervical canal is a pathway through which sperm enter the uterus after being induced by estradiol after penile-vaginal intercourse, and some forms of artificial insemination. Some sperm remains in cervical crypts, infoldings of the endocervix, which act as a reservoir, releasing sperm over several hours and maximising the chances of fertilisation. A theory states the cervical and uterine contractions during orgasm draw semen into the uterus. Although the "upsuck theory" has been generally accepted for some years, it has been disputed due to lack of evidence, small sample size, and methodological errors.

Some methods of fertility awareness, such as the Creighton model and the Billings method involve estimating a woman's periods of fertility and infertility by observing physiological changes in her body. Among these changes are several involving the quality of her cervical mucus: the sensation it causes at the vulva, its elasticity (Spinnbarkeit), its transparency, and the presence of ferning.

=== Cervical mucus ===
Several hundred mucus-secreting crypts in the endocervix produce 20–60 mg of cervical mucus a day, increasing to 600 mg around the time of ovulation. The viscosity and water content vary during the menstrual cycle; cervical mucus is composed of around 93% water, reaching 98% at midcycle. It contains electrolytes such as calcium, sodium, and potassium; organic components such as glucose, amino acids, and soluble proteins; trace elements including zinc, copper, iron, manganese, and selenium; free fatty acids; enzymes such as amylase; and prostaglandins. Its consistency is determined by the influence of the hormones estrogen and progesterone. In the follicular phase of the menstrual cycle, estrogen dominates and cervical mucus gradually becomes thinner, reaching its lowest viscosity at ovulation. At midcycle, around the time of ovulation—a period of high estrogen levels— the mucus is thin and serous to allow sperm to enter the uterus and is more alkaline and, hence, more hospitable to sperm. It is also higher in electrolytes, which results in the "ferning" pattern that can be observed in drying mucus under low magnification; as the mucus dries, the salts crystallize, resembling the leaves of a fern. The mucus has a stretchy character described as Spinnbarkeit most prominent around ovulation.

At other times in the cycle, the mucus is thick and more acidic due to the effects of progesterone. This "infertile" mucus acts as a barrier to keep sperm from entering the uterus. Women taking an oral contraceptive pill also have thick mucus from the effects of progesterone. Thick mucus also prevents pathogens from interfering with a nascent pregnancy.

A cervical mucus plug, called the operculum, forms inside the cervical canal during pregnancy. This provides a protective seal for the uterus against the entry of pathogens and leakage of uterine fluids. The mucus plug is also known to have antibacterial properties. This plug is released as the cervix dilates, either during the first stage of childbirth or shortly before. It is visible as a blood-tinged mucous discharge.

=== Childbirth ===
When the head of the fetus pushes against the cervix, a signal (2) is sent to the brain. This causes a signal to be sent to the pituitary gland to release oxytocin (4). Oxytocin is carried in the bloodstream to the uterus, causing contractions to induce childbirth.

The cervix plays a major role in childbirth. As the fetus descends within the uterus in preparation for birth, the presenting part, usually the head, rests on and is supported by the cervix. As labour progresses, the cervix becomes softer and shorter, begins to dilate, and withdraws to face the anterior of the body. The support the cervix provides to the fetal head starts to give way when the uterus begins its contractions. During childbirth, the cervix must dilate to a diameter of more than 10 cm (3.9 in) to accommodate the head of the fetus as it descends from the uterus to the vagina. In becoming wider, the cervix also becomes shorter, a phenomenon known as effacement.

Along with other factors, midwives and doctors use the extent of cervical dilation to assist decision-making during childbirth. Generally, the active first stage of labour, when the uterine contractions become strong and regular, begins when the cervical dilation is more than 3–5 cm (1.2–2.0 in). The second phase of labor begins when the cervix has dilated to 10 cm (4 in), which is regarded as its fullest dilation, and is when active pushing and contractions push the baby along the birth canal leading to the birth of the baby. The number of past vaginal deliveries is a strong factor in influencing how rapidly the cervix can dilate in labour. The time taken for the cervix to dilate and efface is one factor used in reporting systems such as the Bishop score, used to recommend whether interventions such as a forceps delivery, induction, or Caesarean section should be used in childbirth.

Cervical incompetence is a condition in which shortening of the cervix due to dilation and thinning occurs before a term pregnancy. Short cervical length is the strongest predictor of preterm birth.

=== Contraception ===
Several methods of contraception involve the cervix. Cervical diaphragms are reusable, firm-rimmed plastic devices inserted by a woman before intercourse that cover the cervix. Pressure against the walls of the vagina maintains the position of the diaphragm, and it acts as a physical barrier to prevent the entry of sperm into the uterus, preventing fertilisation. Cervical caps are a similar method, although they are smaller and adhere to the cervix by suction. Diaphragms and caps are often used in conjunction with spermicides. In one year, 12% of women using the diaphragm will undergo an unintended pregnancy, and with optimal use this falls to 6%. Efficacy rates are lower for the cap, with 18% of women undergoing an unintended pregnancy, and 10–13% with optimal use. Most types of progestogen-only pills are effective as a contraceptive because they thicken cervical mucus, making it difficult for sperm to pass along the cervical canal. In addition, they may also sometimes prevent ovulation. In contrast, contraceptive pills that contain both oestrogen and progesterone, the combined oral contraceptive pills, work mainly by preventing ovulation. They also thicken cervical mucus and thin the lining of the uterus, enhancing their effectiveness.

== Clinical significance ==
=== Cancer ===
In 2008, cervical cancer was the third-most common cancer in women worldwide, with rates varying geographically from less than one to more than 50 cases per 100,000 women. It is a leading cause of cancer-related death in poor countries, where delayed diagnosis leading to poor outcomes is common. The introduction of routine screening has resulted in fewer cases of (and deaths from) cervical cancer; this has mainly taken place in developed countries. Most developing countries have limited or no screening, and 85% of the global burden occurs there.

Cervical cancer nearly always involves human papillomavirus (HPV) infection. HPV is a virus with numerous strains, several of which predispose to precancerous changes in the cervical epithelium, particularly in the transformation zone, which is the most common area for cervical cancer to start. HPV vaccines, such as Gardasil and Cervarix, reduce the incidence of cervical cancer, by inoculating against the viral strains involved in cancer development.

Potentially precancerous changes in the cervix can be detected by cervical screening, using methods including a Pap smear (also called a cervical smear), in which epithelial cells are scraped from the surface of the cervix and examined under a microscope. The colposcope, an instrument used to see a magnified view of the cervix, was invented in 1925. The Pap smear was developed by Georgios Papanikolaou in 1928. A LEEP procedure using a heated loop of platinum to excise a patch of cervical tissue was developed by Aurel Babes in 1927. In some parts of the developed world, including the UK, the Pap test has been superseded with liquid-based cytology.

An inexpensive, cost-effective, and practical alternative in poorer countries is visual inspection with acetic acid (VIA). Instituting and sustaining cytology-based programs in these regions can be difficult, due to the need for trained personnel, equipment, and facilities and difficulties in follow-up. With VIA, results and treatment can be available on the same day. As a screening test, VIA is comparable to cervical cytology in accurately identifying precancerous lesions.

A result of dysplasia is usually further investigated, such as by taking a cone biopsy, which may also remove the cancerous lesion. Cervical intraepithelial neoplasia is a possible result of the biopsy and represents dysplastic changes that may eventually progress to invasive cancer. Most cases of cervical cancer are detected in this way, without having caused any symptoms. When symptoms occur, they may include vaginal bleeding, discharge, or discomfort.

=== Inflammation ===
Inflammation of the cervix is referred to as cervicitis. This inflammation may be of the endocervix or ectocervix. When associated with the endocervix, it is associated with a mucous vaginal discharge and sexually transmitted infections such as chlamydia and gonorrhoea. As many as half of pregnant women having a gonorrheal infection of the cervix are asymptomatic. Other causes include overgrowth of the commensal flora of the vagina. When associated with the ectocervix, inflammation may be caused by the herpes simplex virus. Inflammation is often investigated through directly visualising the cervix using a speculum, which may appear whiteish due to exudate, and by taking a Pap smear and examining for causal bacteria. Special tests may be used to identify particular bacteria. If the inflammation is due to a bacterium, then antibiotics may be given as treatment.

=== Anatomical abnormalities ===
Cervical stenosis is an abnormally narrow cervical canal, typically associated with trauma caused by removal of tissue for investigation or treatment of cancer, or cervical cancer itself. Diethylstilbestrol, used from 1938 to 1971 to prevent preterm labour and miscarriage, is also strongly associated with the development of cervical stenosis and other abnormalities in the daughters of the exposed women. Other abnormalities include: vaginal adenosis, in which the squamous epithelium of the ectocervix becomes columnar; cancers such as clear cell adenocarcinomas; cervical ridges and hoods; and development of a cockscomb cervix appearance, which is the condition wherein, as the name suggests, the cervix of the uterus is shaped like a cockscomb. About one-third of women born to diethylstilbestrol-treated mothers (i.e., in-utero exposure) develop a cockscomb cervix.

Enlarged folds or ridges of cervical stroma (fibrous tissues) and epithelium constitute a cockscomb cervix. Similarly, cockscomb polyps lining the cervix are usually considered or grouped into the same overarching description. It is in and of itself considered a benign abnormality; its presence, however, is usually indicative of DES exposure, and as such, women who experience these abnormalities should be aware of their increased risk of associated pathologies.

Cervical agenesis is a rare congenital condition in which the cervix completely fails to develop, often associated with the concurrent failure of the vagina to develop. Other congenital cervical abnormalities exist, often associated with abnormalities of the vagina and uterus. The cervix may be duplicated in situations such as bicornuate uterus and uterine didelphys.

Cervical polyps, which are benign overgrowths of endocervical tissue, if present, may cause bleeding, or a benign overgrowth may be present in the cervical canal. Cervical ectropion refers to the horizontal overgrowth of the endocervical columnar lining in a one-cell-thick layer over the ectocervix.

== Animals ==
Female marsupials have paired uteri and cervices. Most eutherian (placental) mammal species have a single cervix and a single, bipartite or bicornuate uterus. Lagomorphs, rodents, aardvarks, and hyraxes have a duplex uterus and two cervices. Lagomorphs and rodents share many morphological characteristics and are grouped in the clade Glires. Anteaters of the family Myrmecophagidae are unusual in that they lack a defined cervix; they are thought to have lost the characteristic, rather than other mammals developing a cervix on more than one lineage. In domestic pigs, the cervix contains a series of five interdigitating pads that hold the boar's corkscrew-shaped penis during copulation.

== Etymology ==
The word cervix came to English from Latin cervīx, which means "neck". Like its English translation, the Latin word can refer not only to the neck [of the body], but also to an analogous narrowed part of an object. Thus, the term cervix uteri (literally "neck of the uterus") is used in Latin to refer to the uterine cervix, but in English, the word cervix used alone usually refers to it. The first attested use of the word in English to refer to the cervix of the uterus was in 1702. The adjective cervical may refer either to the neck (as in cervical vertebrae or cervical lymph nodes) or to the uterine cervix (as in cervical cap or cervical cancer).

The Latin word cervix was in turn used to translate the Greek word αὐχήν (auchḗn), "neck". The cervix was documented in anatomical literature in at least the time of Hippocrates; cervical cancer was first described more than 2,000 years ago, with descriptions provided by both Hippocrates and Aretaeus. Greek writers usually used the term στόμαχος (stómachos) to refer to the cervical canal; however, there was some variation in the sense of these two words.
