= Cervical dilation =

Opening of the cervix

Cervical dilation chart

Cervical dilation (or cervical dilatation) is the opening of the cervix, the entrance to the uterus, during childbirth, miscarriage, induced abortion, or gynecological surgery. Cervical dilation may occur naturally, or may be induced surgically or medically.

== In childbirth ==
In the later stages of pregnancy, the cervix may already have opened up to 1–3 cm (or more in rarer circumstances), but during labor, repeated uterine contractions lead to further widening of the cervix to about 6 centimeters. From that point, pressure from the presenting part (head in vertex births or bottom in breech births), along with uterine contractions, will dilate the cervix to 10 centimeters, which is "complete." Cervical dilation is accompanied by effacement, the thinning of the cervix.

General guidelines for cervical dilation:

- Latent phase: 0–3 centimeters
- Active labor: 4–7 centimeters
- Transition: 8–10 centimeters
- Complete: 10 centimeters. Delivery of the infant takes place shortly after this stage is reached (although the mother does not always push right away.)

=== Symptoms ===
During pregnancy, the os (opening) of the cervix is blocked by a thick plug of mucus to prevent bacteria from entering the uterus. During dilation, this plug is loosened. It may come out as one piece, or as thick mucus discharge from the vagina. When this occurs, it is an indication that the cervix is beginning to dilate, although not all women will notice this mucus plug being released.

Bloody show is another indication that the cervix is dilating. Bloody show usually comes along with the mucus plug, and may continue throughout labor, making the mucus tinged pink, red or brown. Fresh, red blood is usually not associated with dilation, but rather serious complications such as placental abruption, or placenta previa. Red blood in small quantities often also follows an exam.

The pain experienced during dilation is similar to that of menstruation (although markedly more intense), as period pains are thought to be due to the passing of endometrium through the cervix. Most of the pain during labor is caused by the uterus contracting to dilate the cervix.

=== Induced dilation in childbirth ===
Prostaglandins (P2 and PGE2) contribute to cervical ripening and dilation. The body produces these hormones naturally. Sometimes prostaglandins in synthesized forms are applied directly to the cervix to induce labor. In women who have had a previous caesarean section, the American College of Obstetricians and Gynecologists issued a bulletin that misoprostol never be used for this purpose. ACOG's findings conclude that the collagen softening properties of misoprostol could be absorbed through the cervix and vaginal vault up into the low transverse scar of a typical caesarean section, and significantly increase the risk of uterine rupture. Prostaglandins are also present in human semen, and sexual intercourse is commonly recommended for promoting the onset of labor, although the limited data available makes the effectiveness of this method uncertain.

Other means of natural cervical ripening include nipple stimulation, which produces oxytocin, a hormone which is necessary for uterine contractions. Nipple stimulation can be performed manually, by use of a breast pump, or by suckling. Henci Goer, in her comprehensive book, The Thinking Woman's Guide to a Better Birth, details how this practice was researched in two separate studies of 100 and 200 women in the mid nineteen-eighties. Women were assigned randomly to two groups. In one group, nipples were stimulated for one-hour sessions, three times per day. In the other group, women were to avoid any form of nipple stimulation or sexual intercourse. The researchers concluded in both studies that nipple stimulation could indeed ripen the cervix and in some cases induce uterine contractions. Goer further notes that in the smaller study, an external fetal monitor was used, and no uterine hyperstimulation was noted.

Cervical dilation may be induced mechanically by placing devices inside the cervix that will expand while in place. A balloon catheter may be used. Other products include osmotic dilators, such as laminaria stick (made of dried seaweed) or synthetic hygroscopic materials, which expand when placed in a moist environment.

Results from 2021 systematic reviews of the literature found no differences in caesarean delivery, neonatal, nor maternal outcomes between inpatient or outpatient cervical ripening.

== In abortion care ==
In treatment of spontaneous or induced abortion, preparation (softening and dilating) of the cervix allows the cannulae vacuum aspiration to pass more easily into the uterus, which may make the procedure shorter in duration, more comfortable for the patient, and easier to perform. Preparation may also reduce the rare complications of uterine perforation and cervical injury. Options for cervical preparation prior to the abortion procedure include osmotic dilators and pharmacologic agents. Osmotic dilators produce wide cervical dilation in a predictable fashion and are generally used in more advanced pregnancies. Pharmacologic agents, such as misoprostol and mifepristone, soften the cervix and facilitate cervical dilation, and may be used alone in early pregnancy, or in combination with osmotic dilators prior to dilation and evacuation.

== In hysteroscopy ==
In hysteroscopy, the diameter of the hysteroscope is generally too large to conveniently pass the cervix directly, thereby necessitating cervical dilation to be performed prior to insertion. Cervical dilation can be performed by temporarily stretching the cervix with a series of (cervical) dilators of increasing diameter. Misoprostol prior to hysteroscopy for cervical dilation appears to facilitate an easier and uncomplicated procedure only in premenopausal women.
