= Racefemine =

Tocolytic

Clinical data
- Trade names: Dysmalgine, Evalgin
- Other names: N-(1-Methyl-2-phenoxyethyl)amphetamine; CB-3697; Racephemine
- Drug class: β-Adrenergic receptor agonist; Tocolytic

Identifiers
- IUPAC name: N-(1-phenoxypropan-2-yl)-1-phenylpropan-2-amine
- CAS Number: 22232-57-1
- PubChem CID: 71879
- ChemSpider: 64895
- UNII: GFK50B8Y78
- ChEBI: CHEBI:135109
- ChEMBL: ChEMBL2106250

Chemical and physical data
- Formula: C_{18}H_{23}NO
- Molar mass: 269.388 g·mol^{−1}
- 3D model (JSmol): Interactive image
- SMILES: CC(CC1=CC=CC=C1)NC(C)COC2=CC=CC=C2
- InChI: InChI=1S/C18H23NO/c1-15(13-17-9-5-3-6-10-17)19-16(2)14-20-18-11-7-4-8-12-18/h3-12,15-16,19H,13-14H2,1-2H3; Key:URCIJDUOBBSMII-UHFFFAOYSA-N

Racefemine (INN), sold under the brand names Dysmalgine and Evalgin, is a uterine spasmolytic and muscle relaxant of the amphetamine family. It is the racemic threo form of dextrofemine. The drug acts as a β-adrenergic receptor agonist and sympathomimetic. It appears to no longer be marketed. Other tocolytics with similar chemical structures as phenethylamines or amphetamines include bedoradrine, buphenine, fenoterol, hexoprenaline, isoxsuprine, ritodrine, and terbutaline.
