= Dextrofemine =

Tocolytic

Clinical data
- Trade names: Marsyl, Dysmalgine
- Other names: (+)-N-(1-Methyl-2-phenoxyethyl)amphetamine; CB-3697; Dextrophemine
- Drug class: β-Adrenergic receptor agonist; Tocolytic

Identifiers
- IUPAC name: N-(1-phenoxypropan-2-yl)-1-phenylpropan-2-amine
- CAS Number: 15687-08-8
- PubChem CID: 71879
- ChemSpider: 32699672
- UNII: WVB6I50566
- ChEBI: CHEBI:135109
- ChEMBL: ChEMBL2106250
- CompTox Dashboard (EPA): DTXSID901043133

Chemical and physical data
- Formula: C_{18}H_{23}NO
- Molar mass: 269.388 g·mol^{−1}
- 3D model (JSmol): Interactive image
- SMILES: CC(CC1=CC=CC=C1)NC(C)COC2=CC=CC=C2
- InChI: InChI=1S/C18H23NO/c1-15(13-17-9-5-3-6-10-17)19-16(2)14-20-18-11-7-4-8-12-18/h3-12,15-16,19H,13-14H2,1-2H3; Key:URCIJDUOBBSMII-UHFFFAOYSA-N

Dextrofemine (INN), sold under the brand names Marsyl and Dysmalgine, is a uterine spasmolytic and muscle relaxant of the amphetamine family. It is the dextrorotatory enantiomer of racefemine. The drug acts as a β-adrenergic receptor agonist and sympathomimetic. It was marketed in France in 1966 but appears to no longer be marketed. Other tocolytics with similar chemical structures as phenethylamines or amphetamines include bedoradrine, buphenine, fenoterol, hexoprenaline, isoxsuprine, ritodrine, and terbutaline.

== See also ==
- Phenoxyethylamine
