= Uterine hyperstimulation =

Uterine hyperstimulation or hypertonic uterine dysfunction is a potential complication of labor induction. This is displayed as Uterine tachysystole- the contraction frequency numbering more than five in a 10-minute time frame or as contractions exceeding more than two minutes in duration. Uterine hyperstimulation may result in fetal heart rate abnormalities, uterine rupture, or placental abruption. It is usually treated by administering terbutaline.

== Causes ==
- Mistoprostol is a drug treatment for peptic ulcers that can also cause abortion or induce labor. The use of this drug (inserted vaginally) to induce labor can cause uterine hyperstimulation.

== Treatment ==
Treatments of uterine hyperstimulation are primarily experimental. Those that have shown to alleviate the conditions are:

- Prostoglandin E_{2} is administered before labor to minimize risk of uterine hyperstimulation and to minimize the effects on Fetal Heart Rate.
- Administration of tocolytic treatment with β2-adrenergic drugs has shown to stabilize uterine contractions while also effectively lowering Fetal Heart Rate.
- The usage of a balloon catheter to induce labor rather than Prostoglandin E_{2} lowers the risk of uterine hyperstimulation and its effect on fetal heart rate.
