= Vaginal delivery =

Delivery through the vagina

Sequence of images showing the stages of a normal vaginal delivery (NVD)

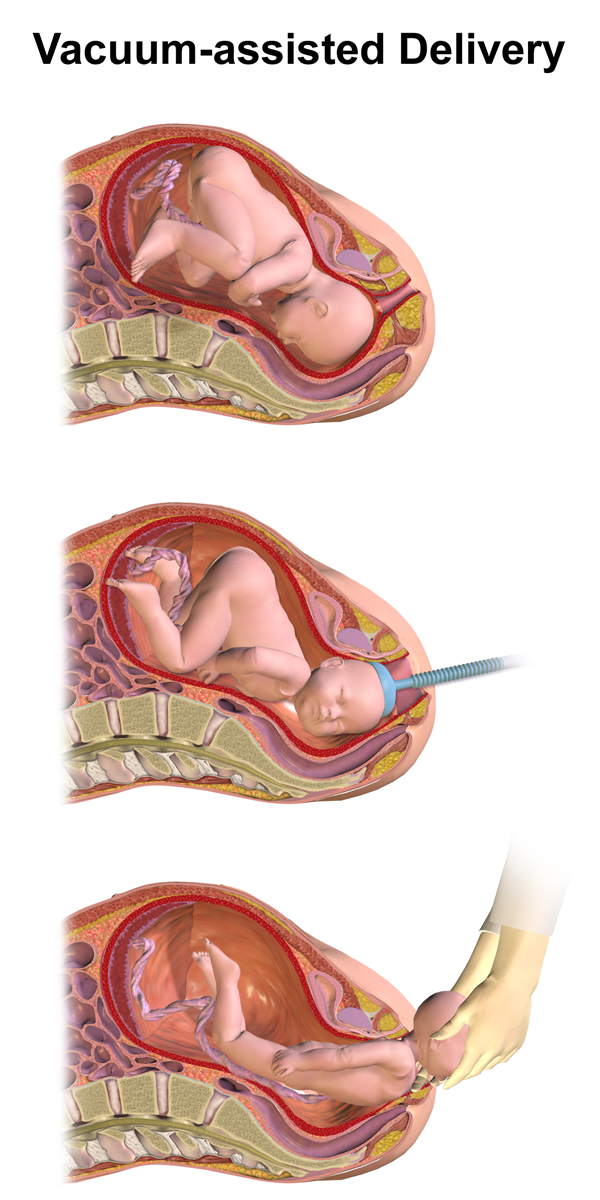
Sequence of images showing stages of an instrumental vaginal delivery

A vaginal delivery is the birth of offspring in mammals (babies in humans) through the vagina (also called the "birth canal"). It is the most common method of childbirth worldwide. It is considered the preferred method of delivery, as it is correlated with lower morbidity and mortality than caesarean sections (C-sections), though it is not clear whether this is causal.

== Epidemiology ==
=== United States ===
70% of births in the United States in 2019 were vaginal deliveries.

=== Global ===
80% of births globally in 2021 were vaginal deliveries, with rates varying from 95% in sub-Saharan Africa to 45% in the Caribbean.

== Benefits of vaginal delivery ==
=== Mother ===
Benefits for the mother include

- Avoiding surgery and resulting quicker recovery time and shorter hospital admission
- Quicker onset of lactation
- Decreased complications in future pregnancies, including placenta previa

=== Infant ===
Benefits for the infant include:

- Develop microbiota from exposure to the bacteria from the mother's vagina, while the microbiota of babies born by caesarean section have more bacteria associated with hospital environments.
- Decreased infant respiratory conditions, including infant respiratory distress syndrome, transient tachypnea of the newborn, and respiratory-related NICU admissions
- Improved immune function, possibly due to the infant's exposure to normal vaginal and gut bacteria during vaginal birth

== Types of vaginal delivery ==
Different types of vaginal deliveries have different terms:

- A spontaneous vaginal delivery (SVD) occurs when a pregnant woman goes into labor without the use of drugs or techniques to induce labor and delivers their baby without forceps, vacuum extraction, or a cesarean section.
- An induced vaginal delivery is a delivery involving labor induction, where drugs or manual techniques are used to initiate labor. Vaginal delivery can be either spontaneous or induced.
- An assisted vaginal delivery (AVD) or instrumental vaginal delivery occurs when a pregnant woman requires the use of special instruments such as forceps or a vacuum extractor to deliver her baby vaginally. It is usually performed when the pregnancy does not progress during the second stage of labor. If the goal is to avoid the adverse effects of pushing that a cardiac patient may experience, it may also be performed in this case. Both spontaneous and induced vaginal delivery can be assisted. Examples of instruments to assist delivery include obstretical forceps and vacuum extraction with a vacuum cup device.

== Stages of labor ==
Labor is characterized by uterine contractions which push the fetus through the birth canal and results in delivery. Labor is divided into three stages.

1. First stage of labor starts with the onset of contractions and finishes when the cervix is fully dilated at 10 cm. This stage can further be divided into latent and active labor. The latent phase is defined by cervical dilation of 0 to 6 cm. The active phase is defined by cervical dilation of 6 cm to 10 cm.
2. Second stage of labor starts when the cervix is dilated to 10 cm and finishes with the birth of the baby. This stage is characterized by strong contractions and active pushing by the mother. It can last from 20 minutes to 2 hours.
3. Third stage of labor starts after the birth of the baby and is finished when the placenta is delivered. It can last from 5 to 30 minutes.

== Risks and complications of vaginal delivery ==
Complications of vaginal delivery can be grouped into the following criteria; failure to progress, abnormal fetal heart rate tracing, intrapartum hemorrhage, and post-partum hemorrhage.

Failure to progress occurs when the labor process slows or stops entirely, indicated by slowed cervical dilation. Factors that place a woman's pregnancy at higher risk include advanced maternal age, Premature Rupture of Membranes (PROM) and induction of labor. Pitocin, a synthetic version of oxytocin, is often administered to induce labour. Oxytocin is a natural hormone and a uterotonic agent which stimulates the uterine muscles to contract and initiate labour. Cesarean section is also commonly considered when the pregnancy fails to progress.

Abnormal fetal heart tracing suggests that the fetus's heart rate has slowed during labor due to head compression, cord compression, hypoxemia or anemia. Uterine tachysystole, the most common adverse effect of oxytocin (usually as a result of a problematic dosage), can result in nonreassuring fetal heart tracing. It can usually be reversed when oxytocin infusion is decreased or stopped. If the abnormal fetal heart rate persists, and uterine tachysystole continues, tocolytic remedies, such as terbutaline, may be used. Afterward, if beneficial and uterine tone has returned to baseline and fetal status is stable, oxytocin as a labor augmenting agent may be resumed. The persistence of an abnormal fetal heart rate may also indicate that a cesarean section is necessary.

Intrapartum hemorrhage is characterized by the presence of copious blood during labor. The bleeding may be due to placental abruption, uterine rupture, placenta accrete, undiagnosed placenta previa, or vasa previa. Cesarean section is indicated.

Post-partum hemorrhage is defined by the loss of at least 1,000 mL of blood accompanied with symptoms of hypovolemia within 24 hours after delivery. Typically, the first symptom is excessive bleeding accompanied by tachycardia. Significant loss of blood may also result in hypotension, nausea, dyspnea, and chest pain. It is estimated that between 3% and 5% of women giving birth vaginally will experience post-partum hemorrhage. Risk factors include fetal macrosomia, pre-eclampsia, and prolonged labor. Prevention consists of administering oxytocin (Pitocin) at delivery and early umbilical cord clamping. Post-partum hemorrhage is usually attributed to uterus atony, when the uterus fails to contract after delivering the baby.

As a result of discrepancies in diagnostic criteria and human variability, there is wide variation in data on maternal and fetal death associated with poor progress.

More than 1 in 10 women with assisted vaginal births develop an infection. Preventive antibiotics are recommended to women who have had an assisted vaginal birth by the World Health Organization. An analysis has showed that preventive antibiotics reduce the risk of infection after an assisted vaginal birth, irrespective of whether a woman has had a perineal tear, an episiotomy, or both. Delays in receiving antibiotics also increases the risk of infection.

== Contraindications to vaginal delivery ==
Spontaneous vaginal delivery at term is the preferred outcome of pregnancy, and according to the International Federation of Gynecology and Obstetrics, will be recommended if there are no evidence-based clinical indications for Cesarean section. However, there are some contraindications for vaginal delivery that would result in conversion to Cesarean delivery. The decision to switch to Cesarean delivery is made by the health care provider and mother and is sometimes delayed until the mother is in labor.

Breech birth presentations occur when the fetus's buttocks or lower extremities are poised to deliver before the fetus's upper extremities or head. The three types of breech positions are footling breech, frank breech, and complete breech. These births occur in 3% to 4% of all term pregnancies. They usually result in Cesarean sections because it is more difficult to deliver the baby through the birth canal and there is a lack of expertise in vaginal breech delivery and therefore fewer vaginal breech deliveries performed. It is also associated with cord prolapse and an elevated risk for birth defects in breech babies. Controversy and debate surround the topic due to different views on the preferred route of delivery when breech presentation occurs. Some health professionals believe that vaginal breech delivery can be a safe alternative to planned Cesarean in certain instances.

Complete placenta previa occurs when the placenta covers the opening of the cervix. If placenta previa is present at the time of delivery, vaginal delivery is contraindicated because the placenta is blocking the fetus's passageway to the vaginal canal.

Herpes simplex virus with active genital lesions or prodromal symptoms is a contraindication for vaginal delivery so as to avoid mother-fetal transfer of HSV lesions.

Untreated human immunodeficiency virus (HIV) infection is a contraindication for vaginal delivery to avoid mother-fetal transfer of human immunodeficiency virus.

== See also ==
- Home birth
- Childbirth
- Caesarian section
- Silent birth
