= Alifedrine =

Chemical compound

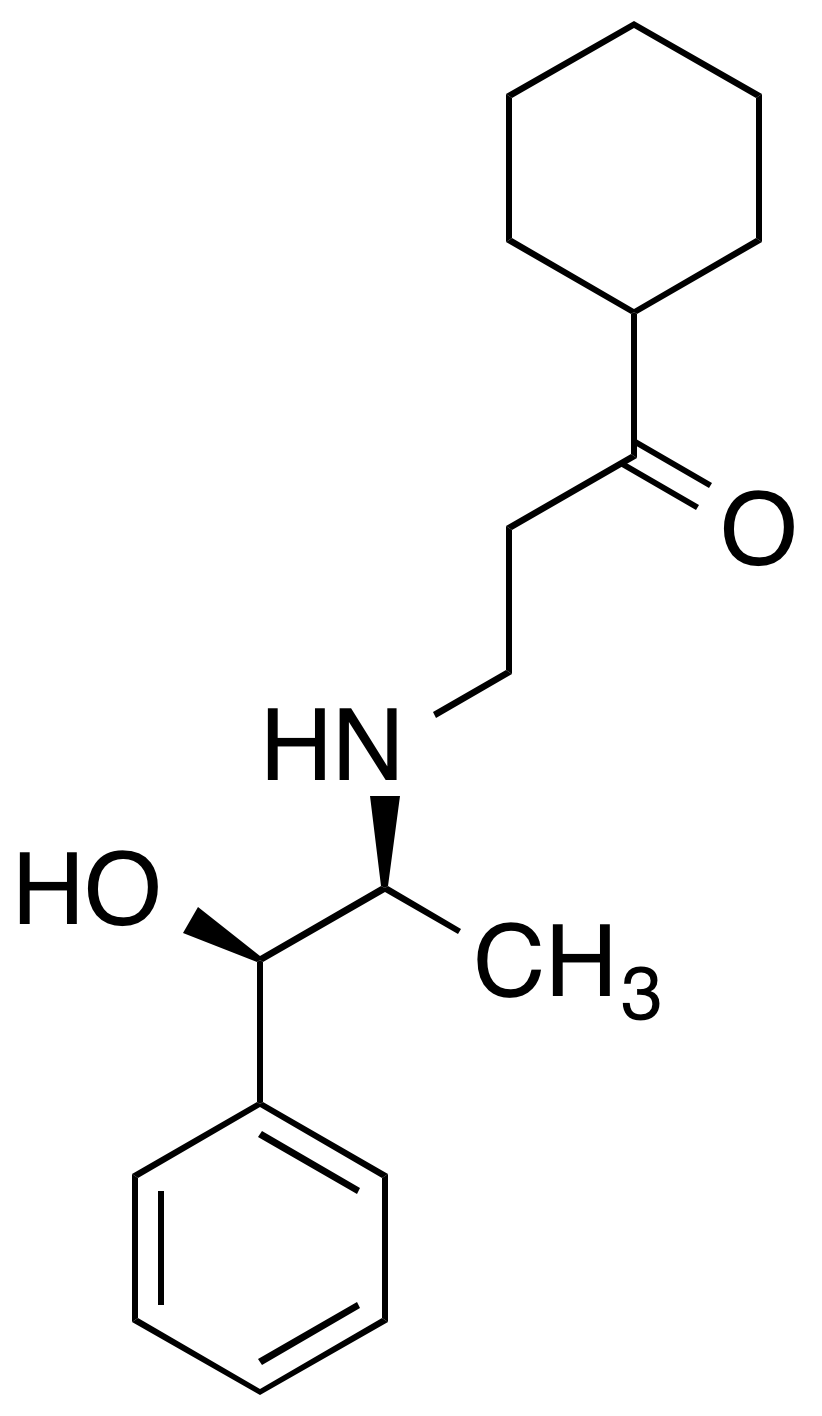

Clinical data
- Other names: D-13625
- Routes of administration: Oral, intravenous
- Drug class: β-Adrenergic receptor partial agonist; Sympathomimetic

Identifiers
- IUPAC name: 1-cyclohexyl-3-[[(1R,2S)-1-hydroxy-1-phenylpropan-2-yl]amino]propan-1-one
- CAS Number: 78756-61-3
- PubChem CID: 51719
- ChemSpider: 46808
- UNII: K2PM66M0VQ
- ChEMBL: ChEMBL2104023
- CompTox Dashboard (EPA): DTXSID00229274

Chemical and physical data
- Formula: C_{18}H_{27}NO_{2}
- Molar mass: 289.419 g·mol^{−1}
- 3D model (JSmol): Interactive image
- SMILES: C[C@@H]([C@@H](C1=CC=CC=C1)O)NCCC(=O)C2CCCCC2
- InChI: InChI=1S/C18H27NO2/c1-14(18(21)16-10-6-3-7-11-16)19-13-12-17(20)15-8-4-2-5-9-15/h3,6-7,10-11,14-15,18-19,21H,2,4-5,8-9,12-13H2,1H3/t14-,18-/m0/s1; Key:UEELVIXXTBPOCF-KSSFIOAISA-N

Alifedrine (INN; developmental code name D-13625) is a drug described as a sympathomimetic and cardiotonic or positive inotropic agent which was never marketed. It is a β-adrenergic receptor partial agonist and was studied in the treatment of heart failure. The drug is taken by mouth or intravenously. It is a β-hydroxylated substituted amphetamine derivative.

== See also ==
- Prenalterol
- Xamoterol
