= Renee Bracey Sherman =

American abortion rights activist

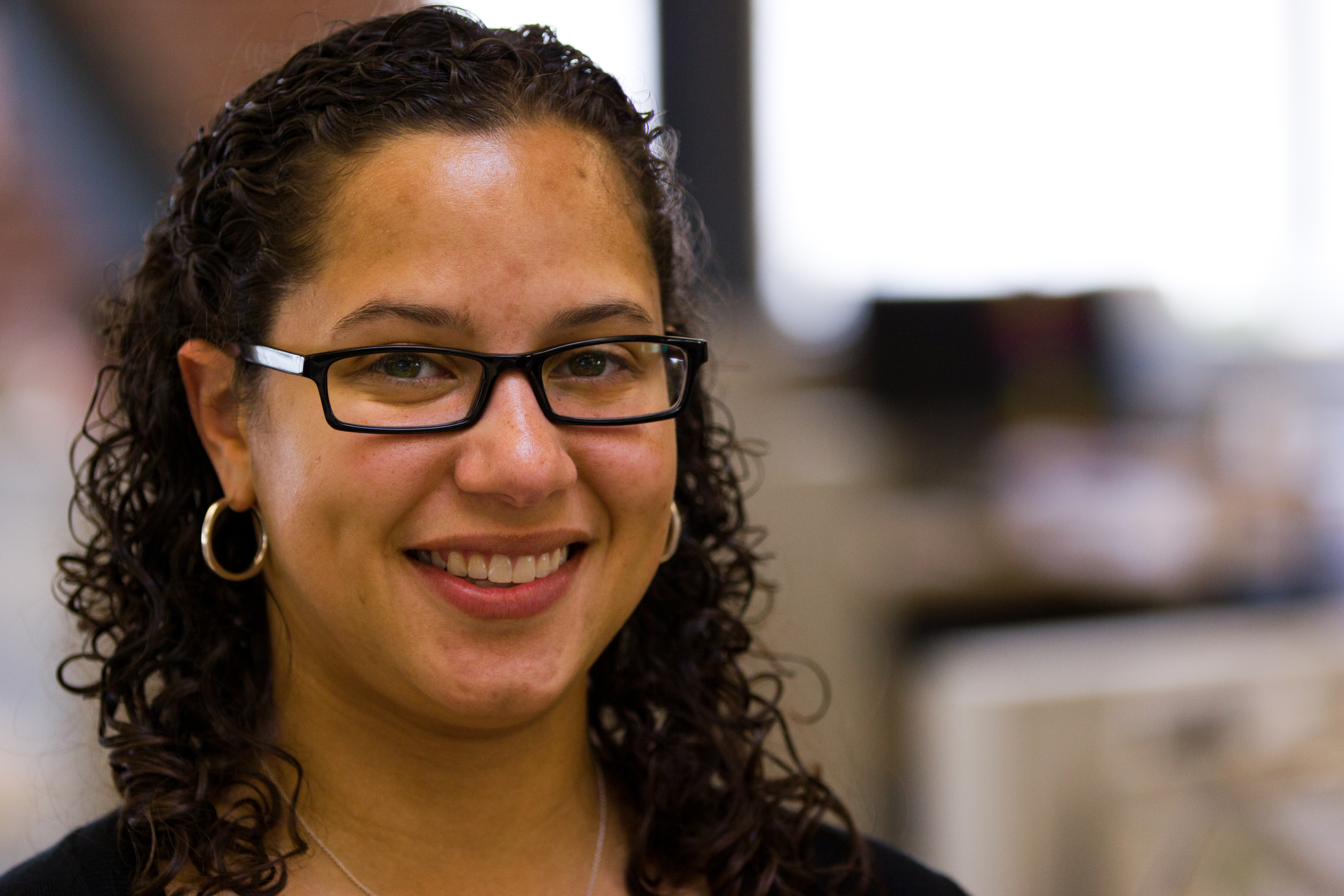
- Bracey Sherman in 2012
- Education: Northeastern Illinois University Cornell University American University
- Occupations: Author, activist
- Website: www.reneebraceysherman.com

Renee Bracey Sherman is an American writer and abortion rights activist. She founded the nonprofit We Testify. She is the co-author of Liberating Abortion: Claiming Our History, Sharing Our Stories, and Building the Reproductive Future We Deserve.

== Life and career ==
Bracey Sherman was raised in the suburbs of Chicago. Her mother is Black and her father is white. Both of her parents were nurses.

She received her master of public administration degree from Cornell University. She enrolled as a communications PhD student studying pop culture and the narratives of people who have abortions at American University in 2025.

Bracey Sherman is an abortion rights activist. She argues that abortion should be normalized, and connects anti-abortion legislation to the criminalization of marginalized groups. She founded the organization We Testify in 2016, which provides a platform to share personal stories about abortion. One of her goals is to expand the diversity of voices in abortion storytelling. Her advocacy is related to her own experience getting an abortion at the age of 19. Bracey Sherman didn't share her decision with her parents for many years even though she was raised in a pro-choice family.

She has criticized the pro-choice movement as exclusionary to women of color, and too moderate with slogans such as "safe, legal, and rare."

While testifying before the House Committee on Energy and Commerce in July 2022, she provided instructions on how to self-manage an abortion with mifepristone and misoprostol pills.
