= Jivdaya Charitable Trust =

The Jivdaya Charitable Trust (JCT), headquartered at Ahmedabad in the Indian state of Gujarat, is a not for profit, non-governmental organisation which provides free medical care to unowned domestic animals and also runs a rehabilitation centre for wild birds and small mammals. Its main objective is to nurture injured animals back to health. It is located in the city centre.

The trust receives a wide variety of birds and animals at its rehabilitation centre. It also has a mobile treatment van in which animals which do not require hospitalisation can be treated on the spot.

Jivdaya veterinarians have been awarded first and second place in the National Surgery Conference. The facility has also been approved by the Forest Department to treat scheduled animals and birds.

== History ==
JCT was founded as a non-governmental organisation in 2007 by Giraben Shah with her father Hasmukh Patel, two trustees, and four employees, and its first facility was built in 2008. It provides medical care to stray domestic animals and runs a rehabilitation centre for wild birds and small mammals. Facilities and equipment include an avian surgery theatre, van, X-ray machine, air purifier, autoclave, and three kennels and cages. It is registered under the Bombay Charity Act is also recognised by the Animal Welfare Board of India. It has an 80-G Tax Exemption Certificate and also has a Foreign Currency Registration Account to allow people living abroad to donate.

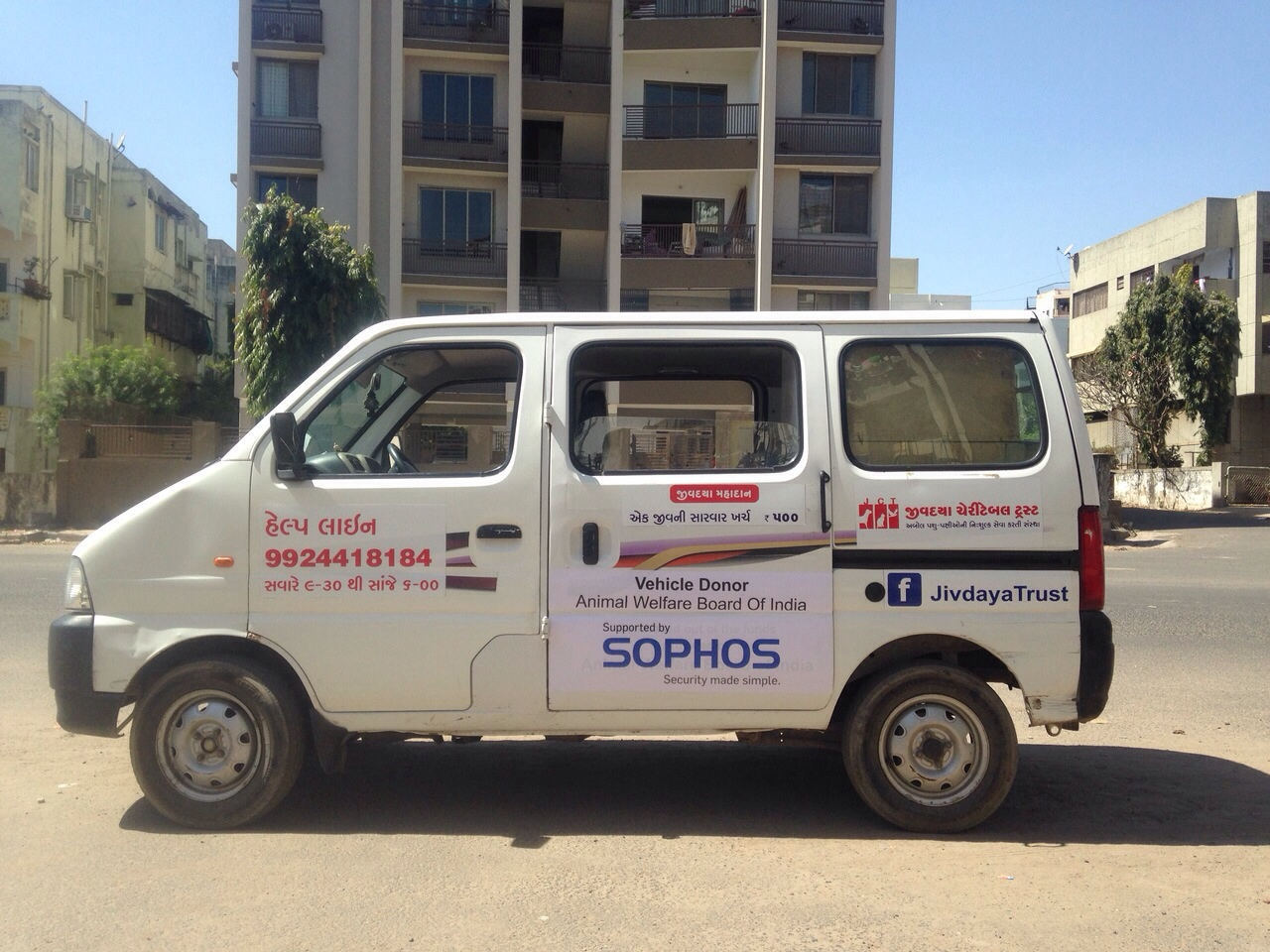
Jivdaya mobile van

The organisation works to create public awareness, especially among young people. It provides medical treatment, shelters sick and injured animals, and promotes vegetarianism. It runs an animal ambulance and helpline number in Ahmedabad in association with the Emergency Management and Research Institute.

In 2017, the organisation launched a campaign to eradicate rabies from street dogs in Ahmedabad. It vaccinated dogs and raised public awareness. An estimated 200 volunteers and 50 members of JCT participated in the drive, which served areas of the city including Bopal, Motera, Naranpura, Nehrunagar, Relief Road and Nava Vadaj.

The COVID-19 lockdown of 2020 and related economic disruptions presented a crisis for stray dogs, as many of them relied on scraps from food sources such as eateries that closed and office workers who were no longer coming to work. JCT volunteers carried porridge, bread, milk and paneer to affected districts. Initially they started by feeding 350 to 400 roadside dogs each day, but later they also started feeding other animals, like cows and camels.

== Functions, campaigns and aid provided ==
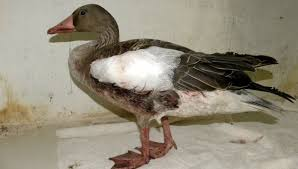
A goose treated during the Save The Birds campaign

=== Save The Birds campaign ===
JCT started this campaign because it noted many fatalities of birds during the Makar Sankranti festival as a result of collisions with kite strings. Ahmedabad is the heartland of this traditional kite flying festival. (The festival is locally called Uttarayana, although Uttarayana also has a slightly different meaning - the six month period between the winter and summer solstices). The organisation suggests that people fly their kites later in the day, rather than early in the morning when birds are flying out in search of food.

Jivdaya invites a force of 50 veterinarians every year during the festival of Uttarayan, from across India and other countries. Among the species rescued in recent years have been various endangered and migratory birds.

JCT spends around 8 to 9 lakhs (US$12,000) on this campaign every year. This money goes to housing for visiting veterinarians, medical equipment and medicine.

During 2017 Jivdaya attended to more than 2,390 birds in Ahmedabad, approximately 490 of which died. In January 2019, JCT recorded 100 bird fatalities before Uttarayan even started. It treated around 945 birds during 14 and 15 January 2019 alone. The effort involved around 300 volunteers.

Vultures, which are already endangered because of the veterinary drug diclofenac, are of particular concern. The eggs of the critically endangered white-rumped vulture hatch in January, so during the kite-flying season the birds are scouting for food for their fledglings at least three times a day.

Birds whose feathers are damaged or clipped, for reasons including but not limited to collisions with kite strings, can now be treated with feather implants. JCT pioneered the technique in 2018. It is performed under anaesthesia.

=== Blood donation by dogs ===
Whenever a dog is need of blood, JCT uses another dog with the same blood group as a blood donor. JCT was the first non-governmental organisation to successfully implement this technique in Ahmedabad. The initial use of the technique was sparked by necessity when a dog that had been in an accident and lost a lot of blood was brought in.

== Awards and internship programs ==
Jivdaya provides various internship programs to students from UK and US every year. The students come to the hospital to get training. It also has specialists from India and abroad come to its hospital year-round to help in the treatment of animals and also to take various workshop and sessions with the existing faculty and staff. Among awards won by JCT was the One Show Award in New York in May 2016.

== See also ==
- Animal Welfare Board of India
