= C12H17N3O =

The molecular formula C_{12}H_{17}N_{3}O (molar mass: 219.28 g/mol, exact mass: 219.1372 u) may refer to:

- Cimaterol
- RO5166017
