= Visceral gout =

Visceral gout is a disease of birds in which kidney failure causes a build-up of urates in the internal organs, leaving a chalky white coating on them. Symptoms include anorexia and emaciation.

It is a problem common to caged birds. Vultures are particularly sensitive to poisoning by diclofenac, which leads to kidney failure, visceral gout, and death.

== Threat to vultures ==
The collapse of the vulture population in India and Pakistan, to about a twentieth of their original numbers, has been caused by diclofenac, which is a non-steroidal anti-inflammatory drug (NSAID). Diclofenac is given to working and ill farm cattle to reduce pain so that they can work on the land for longer. Farmers leave dead farm animals out in the open for the vultures to tidy up, and the vultures then feed from the carcasses of the cattle that die, and are poisoned by the diclofenac contained in the flesh they eat.

Vultures are now not present in large enough numbers to tidy up all the dead animals. Instead, dead animals are now likely to rot in the open and be partly eaten by rats or wild dogs or other pests, causing major concern and human health hazards including risks of rabies.

Meloxicam (another NSAID) has been found to be harmless to vultures and should prove an acceptable alternative to diclofenac. The Government of India has banned diclofenac, but it continues to be sold over a year later and is still a problem in other parts of the World.
