= Mabuterol =

Chemical compound

Clinical data
- Other names: Mabuterolum; PB 868Cl

Identifiers
- IUPAC name: 1-[4-amino-3-chloro-5-(trifluoromethyl)phenyl]-2-(tert-butylamino)ethanol
- CAS Number: 56341-08-3
- PubChem CID: 3995
- ChemSpider: 3857
- UNII: R4K19W6S7Q
- ChEBI: CHEBI:135325
- ChEMBL: ChEMBL86749
- CompTox Dashboard (EPA): DTXSID3048283

Chemical and physical data
- Formula: C_{13}H_{18}ClF_{3}N_{2}O
- Molar mass: 310.75 g·mol^{−1}
- 3D model (JSmol): Interactive image
- SMILES: Clc1cc(cc(c1N)C(F)(F)F)C(O)CNC(C)(C)C
- InChI: InChI=1S/C13H18ClF3N2O/c1-12(2,3)19-6-10(20)7-4-8(13(15,16)17)11(18)9(14)5-7/h4-5,10,19-20H,6,18H2,1-3H3; Key:JSJCTEKTBOKRST-UHFFFAOYSA-N

Mabuterol is a selective β_{2} adrenoreceptor agonist.

== Synthesis ==
Mabuterol synthesis

The halogenation of 2-(trifluoromethyl)aniline (1) with iodine and sodium bicarbonate produces 2-amino-5-iodobenzotrifluoride (2). Protection with acetic anhydride followed by nucleophilic aromatic substitution with copper(I) cyanide gives N-[4-cyano-2-(trifluoromethyl)phenyl]acetamide (3). Hydrolysis of the nitrile and the protecting group gives 4-amino-3-(trifluoromethyl)benzoic acid (4). Halogenation with chlorine then gives 4-amino-3-chloro-5-(trifluoromethyl)benzoic acid (5). Halogenation of the acid with thionyl chloride gives 4-amino-3-chloro-5-(trifluoromethyl)benzoylchloride (6). Treatment with diethyl malonate gives the acetophenone derivative 1-[4-amino-3-chloro-5-(trifluoromethyl)phenyl]ethanone (7). Halogenation with bromine in acetic acid leads to 1-[4-amino-3-chloro-5-(trifluoromethyl)phenyl]-2-bromoethanone (8). Treatment with tert-butylamine yields 1-[4-amino-3-chloro-5-(trifluoromethyl)phenyl]-2-(tert-butylamino)ethenone (9). Reduction of the ketone with sodium borohydride completes the synthesis of mabuterol (10).

== See also ==
- Clenbuterol
- Cimaterol
