= Zinterol =

Names
- IUPAC name N-[5-[2-[(1,1-dimethyl-2-phenylethyl)amino]-1-hydroxyethyl]-2-hydroxyphenyl]methanesulfonamide

Identifiers
CAS Number	37000-20-7
3D model (JSmol)	Interactive image
ChEMBL	ChEMBL1243407
ChemSpider	34825
ECHA InfoCard	100.189.867
IUPHAR/BPS	3466
MeSH	Zinterol
PubChem CID	37990
UNII	7167N7AJJR
CompTox Dashboard (EPA)	DTXSID70865845
- InChI: InChI=1S/C19H26N2O4S/c1-19(2,12-14-7-5-4-6-8-14)20-13-18(23)15-9-10-17(22)16(11-15)21-26(3,24)25/h4-11,18,20-23H,12-13H2,1-3H3 Key: XJBCFFLVLOPYBV-UHFFFAOYSA-N; InChI=1/C19H26N2O4S/c1-19(2,12-14-7-5-4-6-8-14)20-13-18(23)15-9-10-17(22)16(11-15)21-26(3,24)25/h4-11,18,20-23H,12-13H2,1-3H3 Key: XJBCFFLVLOPYBV-UHFFFAOYAI
- SMILES: O=S(=O)(Nc1cc(ccc1O)C(O)CNC(C)(C)Cc2ccccc2)C

Properties
Chemical formula	C_{19}H_{26}N_{2}O_{4}S
Molar mass	378.49 g/mol
- Except where otherwise noted, data are given for materials in their standard state (at 25 °C [77 °F], 100 kPa). verify (what is ?) Infobox references

Zinterol is a beta-adrenergic agonist.

Its structure is based on soterenol (antiarrhythmic) and phentermine.
