= Uterine tachysystole =

Medical condition during pregnancy

Uterine tachysystole is a condition of excessively frequent uterine contractions during pregnancy. It is most often seen in induced or augmented labor, though it can also occur during spontaneous labor, and this may result in fetal hypoxemia and acidosis. This may have serious effects on both the mother and the fetus, including hemorrhage and death. There are still major gaps in understanding treatment as well as clinical outcomes of this condition. Uterine tachysystole is defined as more than 5 contractions in 10 minutes, averaged over a 30-minute period.

== Signs and Symptoms ==
Excessive contractions may be a sign of placental abruption or obstructed labor potentially leading to uterine tachysystole. Fetal hypoxemia is associated with uterine tachysystole.

== Cause and Correlations ==
Researchers have determined that uterine tachysystole is not able to be predicted by either demographic or clinical factors, but there are factors that may correlate with the diagnosis. Misoprostol use and oxytocin use correlate with uterine tachysystole. Oxytocin is suspected to be a contributor to abnormally increased uterine contractions and uterine tachysystole, but further research is needed for this suspicion to be confirmed. There has been practice of using nipple stimulation to induce labor. However, one study reveals that this may be dangerous because of the uncontrolled release of oxytocin which has shown to correlate to the onset of uterine tachysystole. Prostaglandins, commonly used for initial stages of labor induction or augmentation, have been associated with tachysystole as well as fetal distress.

The presence of uterine leiomyomas have shown to correlate with the incidence of uterine tachysystole.

Antepartum hemorrhage and chorioamnionitis are potential pathological causes for spontaneous uterine tachysystole. Previous cesarean sections could potentially be a precursor to future uterine tachysystole as well. There are no confirmed significant predictors for this condition.

== Pathophysiology ==
The function of the placenta is to act as the lungs and be a vessel of gas exchange for the fetus as this is where oxygen is exchanged for carbon dioxide. In the absence of laboring and contracting, blood flow into the intervillous space results from spiral arterial pressure exceeding intramyometrial pressure, or uterine pressure. During a contraction, uterine blood flow becomes disrupted as myometrial pressure elevates to a higher level than spiral arterial pressure, and this disallows oxygen to reach the fetus through the placenta during these contractions. During normal labor contractions, there is adequate time for a fetus to recover its levels of oxygenation during the relaxation time between contractions.

Contractions that are stronger than normal and have a shortened relaxation time disallow for the placenta to receive adequate levels of blood flow which likely leads to the fetus receiving lower levels of oxygen through the placenta. A contraction with 30 mmHg or more leads to reduced placental blood flow and a potentially hypoxic fetus. The duration of the contraction affects the length of time in which the spiral arteries are compressed, and the strength of the contraction affects the degree of arterial compression. Throughout the laboring processing, this leads to progressive decrease in fetal oxygen saturation and fetal intracerebral oxygen saturation as fetal hypoxia occurs when contractions are either too long or too strong.

The fetal oxygen reserve functions to supply the fetus with the oxygen that it needs to maintain adequate oxygen levels during transient stages of decreased oxygen partial pressure such as during contractions so that the fetus is able to tolerate the contractions. This fetal oxygen reserve is effective during normal laboring, but as contractions become more frequent, there is less and less time for oxygen levels to be replenished which then leads to fetal hypoxia. This reduced relaxation period between contractions also results in an inability to clear acidotic metabolites from the cells which may lead to fetal acidosis.

Fetal pulse oximetry gave researchers the means to quantify the effects that result from uterine tachysystole. In 2008, 1,493 contractions were studied across 30 patients. The conclusion of this study revealed that there is a 6% decrease in fetal partial pressure of oxygen every 8 minutes during uterine tachysystole. The fetus' oxygen saturation levels begin to deplete within about 5 minutes of the onset of uterine tachysystole and their hypoxic states exacerbated until the UT was able to be stopped. Several other factors may worsen the clinical presentation of uterine tachysystole such as pregnancy or labor complications that compound hypoxia or acidosis in the fetus, a fetus with a already compromised baseline oxygenation due to intrauterine growth restriction, oligohydramnios, and cord compression, and preexisting uteroplacental insufficiency due to hypertensive disorders, post-term pregnancy, or diabetes.

== Diagnosis ==
Uterine tachysystole is diagnosed upon the presence of several different clinical presentations of a laboring patient. If a patient experiences any of the following presentations during labor, they may receive a diagnosis of uterine tachysystole:

1. The patient experiences more than five contractions in 10 minutes over a 30 minute time period
2. The patient experiences a series of single contractions with a duration of at least two minutes
3. The patient experiences contractions with normal duration, but the contractions occur within one minute of each other

== Treatment or Management ==
When fetal distress and hypoxia results from uterine tachysystole, tocolytic medications may be used to attempt to improve the baby's oxygen levels. There is not sufficient research that gives a clear indication as to which tocolytic drug is safer for the patient. An emergency delivery or cesarean section may also be an effective treatment option, tocolytic drugs are very important in low-resource environments when a C-section may not be available. Methods such as inserting a transcervical foley catheter are also effective in reducing the incidence of uterine tachysystole.

== Prognosis ==
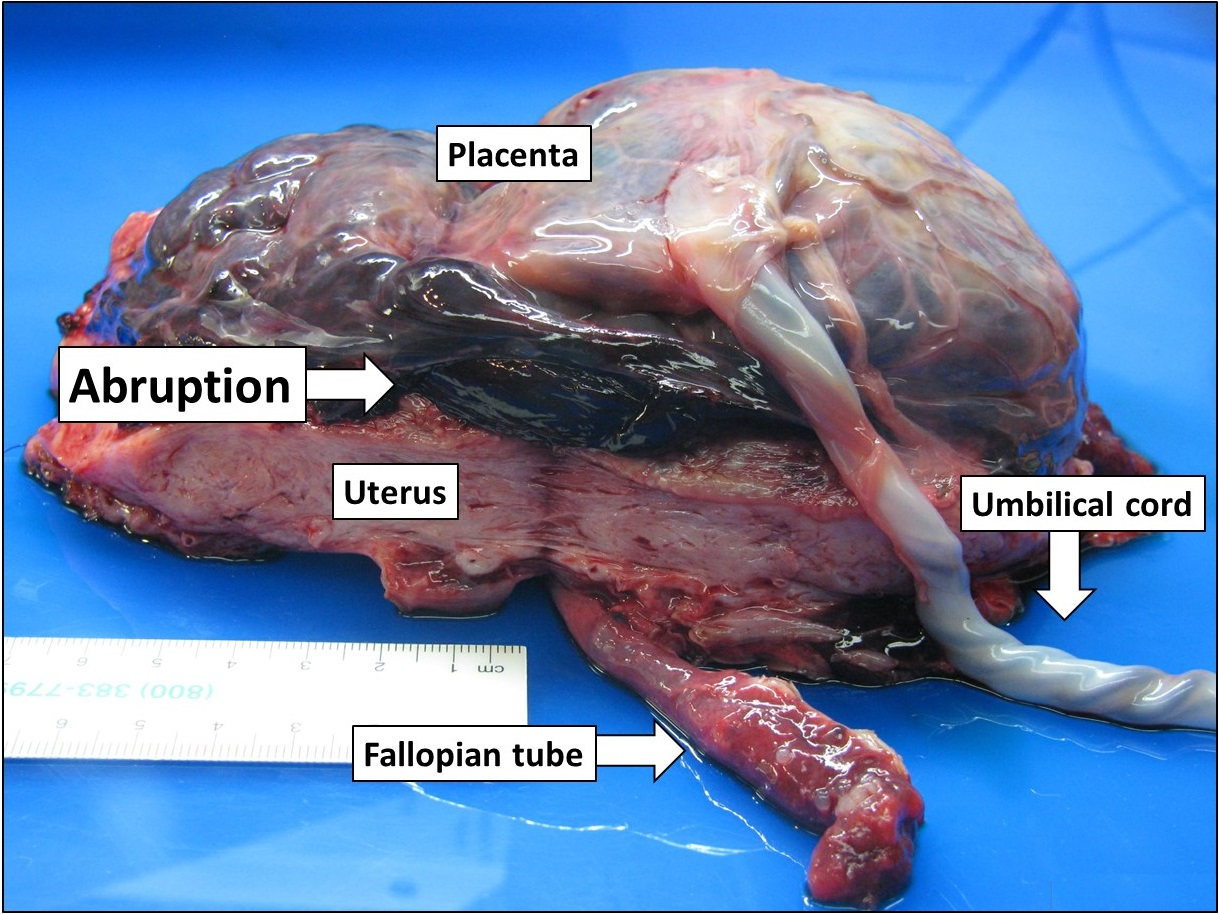
Visual depiction of placental abruption

Serious effects may result in hypoxic babies that suffer through uterine tachysystole such as cerebral palsy, organ damage, acidemia/acidosis, brain damage and death. Some of these consequences may be life-long for the mother or the fetus. Newborns born to mothers that experiences tachysystole were two times as likely to be admitted into NICU. There are also risks that are posed to the mother as well resulting from UT including increased C-section rates, cervical laceration, placental abruption or uterine rupture (for women with history of C-sections), infection, antepartum or postpartum hemorrhage, increased risk of amniotic fluid embolism, and death.

== Epidemiology ==
A study of 890 patients revealed that about 11.1% of the sample had a minimum of one episode of uterine tachysystole with the incidence being higher in non-whites. The adjusted odds ratio for UT in Hispanics was about 1.66 with a 95% confidence interval of 1.28-2.05, 1.58 for African Americans with a 95% confidence interval of about 1.05-2.38, and 1.51 for Asians with a 95% confidence interval of about 1.13-2.0. The subjects in the study with uterine tachysystole had a higher usage of epidural analgesia with 62.2% of those with UT having taken an epidural compared to the 40.9% of the subjects in the group without UT having taken an epidural ( p < 0.001). Uterine tachysystole was found in higher rates among women who had yet to have previously born a viable child as well as in women carrying heavier fetuses.

== Research directions ==
Further research is needed on uterine tachysystole with larger sample sizes of women. Future directions of research may include the measure of clinically relevant outcomes for the mother and the baby resulting from uterine tachysystole such as death, well-being, and safety of the mother and/or the baby. Future research on the administration of misoprostol is needed so that this medication may be able to be safely administered to induce labor while simultaneously minimizing the risk of developing uterine tachysystole.
