= Bromoacetylalprenololmenthane =

- Skeletal formula of bromoacetylalprenololmenthane

Names
- IUPAC name 2-bromo-N-[2-[4-[[2-hydroxy-3-(2-prop-2-enylphenoxy)propyl]amino]-4-methylcyclohexyl]propan-2-yl]acetamide

Identifiers
CAS Number	76298-89-0; 82870-40-4
3D model (JSmol)	Interactive image; Interactive image
Abbreviations	BAAM, BrAAM
ChEMBL	ChEMBL46136
ChemSpider	112852
MeSH	Bromoacetylalprenololmenthane
PubChem CID	127126
CompTox Dashboard (EPA)	DTXSID70997650
- InChI: InChI=1S/C24H37BrN2O3/c1-5-8-18-9-6-7-10-21(18)30-17-20(28)16-26-24(4)13-11-19(12-14-24)23(2,3)27-22(29)15-25/h5-7,9-10,19-20,26,28H,1,8,11-17H2,2-4H3,(H,27,29) Key: UAXZWLFRPNDCMX-UHFFFAOYSA-N; InChI=1/C24H37BrN2O3/c1-5-8-18-9-6-7-10-21(18)30-17-20(28)16-26-24(4)13-11-19(12-14-24)23(2,3)27-22(29)15-25/h5-7,9-10,19-20,26,28H,1,8,11-17H2,2-4H3,(H,27,29) Key: UAXZWLFRPNDCMX-UHFFFAOYAY
- SMILES: CC(C)(NC(=O)CBr)C1CCC(C)(CC1)NCC(O)COC1=CC=CC=C1CC=C; BrCC(=O)NC(C2CCC(NCC(O)COc1ccccc1CC=C)(CC2)C)(C)C

Properties
Chemical formula	C_{24}H_{37}BrN_{2}O_{3}
Molar mass	481.475 g·mol^{−1}
log P	4.14
Acidity (pK_{a})	13.844
Basicity (pK_{b})	0.153
- Except where otherwise noted, data are given for materials in their standard state (at 25 °C [77 °F], 100 kPa). verify (what is ?) Infobox references

Bromoacetylalprenololmenthane (BAAM or BrAAM) is a β adrenergic receptor agonist.
