= Diclofenac/misoprostol =

Combination drug

Combination of
- Diclofenac: NSAID
- Misoprostol: Prostaglandin analog

Clinical data
- Trade names: Arthrotec
- MedlinePlus: a699002
- License data: US DailyMed: Diclofenac sodium and misoprostol
- Pregnancy category: Contraindicated
- Routes of administration: By mouth
- ATC code: M01AB55 (WHO)

Legal status
- Legal status: CA: ℞-only; UK: POM (Prescription only); US: ℞-only

Identifiers
- CAS Number: 239810-53-8
- KEGG: D11091

Diclofenac/misoprostol, sold under the brand name Arthrotec, is a fixed-dose combination medication that contains:

- Diclofenac sodium: Nonsteroidal anti-inflammatory drug (NSAID) with analgesic properties
- Misoprostol: Gastrointestinal (GI) mucosal protective prostaglandin E_{1} analog.

In the United Kingdom it is marketed by Pharmacia and it is indicated for prophylaxis against NSAID-induced gastroduodenal ulceration in people requiring diclofenac for rheumatoid arthritis or osteoarthritis.

The American College of Rheumatology and a Canadian consensus report both recommend GI-protective agents such as misoprostol be combined with long term NSAID therapy and a review concluded that diclofenac/misoprostol is a cost effective treatment in patients requiring long term NSAID therapy who are at increased risk of developing gastropathy.

== Contraindications ==
Arthrotec must not be taken during pregnancy, as it may deform or otherwise harm the fetus, or lead to miscarriage. This may be accompanied by potentially dangerous bleeding, possibly requiring surgery and potentially leading to infertility or death.
