= Bedoradrine =

Ultra-selective long-acting β2-adrenergic receptor agonist that was never marketed

Clinical data
- Other names: KUR-1246; MN-221

Identifiers
- IUPAC name: 2-[[(7S)-7-[[(2R)-2-hydroxy-2-[4-hydroxy-3-(2-hydroxyethyl)phenyl]ethyl]amino]-5,6,7,8-tetrahydronaphthalen-2-yl]oxy]-N,N-dimethylacetamide
- CAS Number: 194785-19-8
- PubChem CID: 9963057
- DrugBank: DB05590
- ChemSpider: 8138654
- UNII: 4EAR229231
- ChEMBL: ChEMBL2111083
- CompTox Dashboard (EPA): DTXSID60173123

Chemical and physical data
- Formula: C_{24}H_{32}N_{2}O_{5}
- Molar mass: 428.529 g·mol^{−1}
- 3D model (JSmol): Interactive image
- SMILES: CN(C)C(=O)COC1=CC2=C(CC[C@@H](C2)NC[C@@H](C3=CC(=C(C=C3)O)CCO)O)C=C1
- InChI: InChI=1S/C24H32N2O5/c1-26(2)24(30)15-31-21-7-4-16-3-6-20(12-19(16)13-21)25-14-23(29)17-5-8-22(28)18(11-17)9-10-27/h4-5,7-8,11,13,20,23,25,27-29H,3,6,9-10,12,14-15H2,1-2H3/t20-,23-/m0/s1; Key:OANCEOSLKSTLTA-REWPJTCUSA-N

Bedoradrine (INN; developmental code names KUR-1246, MN-221) is a sympathomimetic and bronchodilator medication that was developed for the treatment of preterm labor, asthma, and chronic obstructive pulmonary disease (COPD) but was never marketed. It acts as an ultra-selective long-acting β_{2}-adrenergic receptor agonist. The drug was intended for intravenous administration.

== See also ==
- Hexoprenaline
- Ritodrine
- Terbutaline
