= Prenalterol =

Chemical compound

Clinical data
- Trade names: Hyprenan
- Other names: CGP-7760B; CGP-7760/B; H-133/22; IHP
- Routes of administration: Oral, IV
- ATC code: C01CA13 (WHO)

Legal status
- Legal status: In general: ℞ (Prescription only)

Identifiers
- IUPAC name: 4-{[(2S)-2-hydroxy-3-(isopropylamino)propyl]oxy}phenol
- CAS Number: 57526-81-5
- PubChem CID: 42396
- IUPHAR/BPS: 537
- ChemSpider: 38665
- UNII: M4G34404CX
- ChEMBL: ChEMBL1160714
- CompTox Dashboard (EPA): DTXSID8023507
- ECHA InfoCard: 100.055.246

Chemical and physical data
- Formula: C_{12}H_{19}NO_{3}
- Molar mass: 225.288 g·mol^{−1}
- 3D model (JSmol): Interactive image
- SMILES: O(c1ccc(O)cc1)C[C@@H](O)CNC(C)C
- InChI: InChI=1S/C12H19NO3/c1-9(2)13-7-11(15)8-16-12-5-3-10(14)4-6-12/h3-6,9,11,13-15H,7-8H2,1-2H3/t11-/m0/s1; Key:ADUKCCWBEDSMEB-NSHDSACASA-N

Prenalterol, sold under the brand name Hyprenan, is a sympathomimetic agent and cardiac stimulant which acts as a β_{1}-adrenergic receptor partial agonist and is used in the treatment of heart failure. It has selectivity for the β_{1}-adrenergic receptor. Its partial agonist activity or intrinsic sympathomimetic activity is about 60%. It is said to have much greater impact on myocardial contractility than on heart rate. The drug has been marketed in Denmark, Norway, and Sweden.

== Chemistry ==
=== Synthesis ===
==== Stereospecific ====
Prenalterol exhibits adrenergic agonist activity in spite of an interposed oxymethylene group. The stereospecific synthesis devised for this molecule relies on the fact that the side chain is very similar in oxidation state to that of a sugar.

Prenalterol synthesis

Condensation of monobenzone (2) with the epoxide derived from α-D-glucofuranose affords the glycosylated derivative (3). Hydrolytic removal of the acetonide protecting groups followed by cleavage of the sugar with periodate gives aldehyde (4). This is reduced to the glycol by means of NaBH_{4} and the terminal alcohol is converted to the mesylate (5). Displacement of the leaving group with isopropylamine followed by hydrogenolytic removal of the O-benzyl ether affords the β_{1}-adrenergic selective adrenergic agonist prenalterol (6).

==== Racemic ====
Several preparations of the racemic mixture have been reported.

== See also ==
- Alifedrine
- Xamoterol
