= Broxaterol =

- Kekulé skeletal formula of broxaterol

Names
- IUPAC name 1-(3-Bromo-5-isoxazolyl)-2-(tert-butylamino)ethanol

Identifiers
CAS Number	76596-57-1
3D model (JSmol)	Interactive image
ChEMBL	ChEMBL2105475
ChemSpider	64294
ECHA InfoCard	100.071.338
MeSH	Broxaterol
PubChem CID	71149
UNII	ZE4IRB4DUC
CompTox Dashboard (EPA)	DTXSID20868402
- InChI: InChI=1S/C9H15BrN2O2/c1-9(2,3)11-5-6(13)7-4-8(10)12-14-7/h4,6,11,13H,5H2,1-3H3 Key: JBRBWHCVRGURBA-UHFFFAOYSA-N; InChI=1/C9H15BrN2O2/c1-9(2,3)11-5-6(13)7-4-8(10)12-14-7/h4,6,11,13H,5H2,1-3H3 Key: JBRBWHCVRGURBA-UHFFFAOYAK
- SMILES: CC(C)(C)NCC(C1=CC(=NO1)Br)O

Properties
Chemical formula	C_{9}H_{15}BrN_{2}O_{2}
Molar mass	263.135 g·mol^{−1}
- Except where otherwise noted, data are given for materials in their standard state (at 25 °C [77 °F], 100 kPa). Infobox references

Broxaterol is a β_{2} adrenoreceptor agonist. It is part of a class of drugs that affect the smooth muscle receptors in the body, often in use cases for respiratory disease that respond to this type of treatment.

== Synthesis ==

The 1,3-dipolar cycloaddition between bromonitrile oxide, produced in situ from dibromoformaldoxime, and 3-butyn-2-one gives a mixture of isoxazoles, mainly the isomer shown required for broxaterol. Selective α-bromination of the acetyl group with pyridinium tribromide gives a bromoketone whose carbonyl group is reduced with sodium borohydride to produce a bromoethanol derivative. Treatment of this with tert-butylamine yields broxaterol.
