= Xamoterol =

Cardiac stimulant drug

Clinical data
- Trade names: Corwin, Carwin, Corwil, Xamtol
- Routes of administration: By mouth
- ATC code: C01CX07 (WHO)

Pharmacokinetic data
- Bioavailability: Oral: 5%
- Elimination half-life: 16–27 hours

Identifiers
- IUPAC name: (RS)-N-(2-{[2-hydroxy-3-(4-hydroxyphenoxy)propyl]amino}ethyl)morpholine-4-carboxamide
- CAS Number: 81801-12-9
- PubChem CID: 155774
- IUPHAR/BPS: 538
- DrugBank: DB13781
- ChemSpider: 137213
- UNII: 7HE0JQL703
- KEGG: D06328
- ChEMBL: ChEMBL75753
- CompTox Dashboard (EPA): DTXSID8045222

Chemical and physical data
- Formula: C_{16}H_{25}N_{3}O_{5}
- Molar mass: 339.392 g·mol^{−1}
- 3D model (JSmol): Interactive image
- SMILES: O=C(NCCNCC(O)COc1ccc(O)cc1)N2CCOCC2
- InChI: InChI=1S/C16H25N3O5/c20-13-1-3-15(4-2-13)24-12-14(21)11-17-5-6-18-16(22)19-7-9-23-10-8-19/h1-4,14,17,20-21H,5-12H2,(H,18,22); Key:DXPOSRCHIDYWHW-UHFFFAOYSA-N

Xamoterol, sold under the brand names Corwin, Carwin, Corwil, and Xamtol among others, is a cardiac stimulant which is used in the treatment of heart failure. It acts as a selective partial agonist of the β_{1}-adrenergic receptor with around 50% intrinsic sympathomimetic activity (ISA) (i.e., intrinsic activity). The drug has no significant β_{2}-adrenergic receptor agonistic activity. Xamoterol provides cardiac stimulation at rest but acts as a blocker during exercise. It is taken by mouth.

Xamoterol is not available in the United States. It is marketed in the United Kingdom, Austria, Belgium, and Luxembourg.

Xamoterol is a hydrophilic compound with a predicted log P of -0.31 to -1.11. Due to its hydrophilicity, xamoterol does not cross the blood–brain barrier and has no central nervous system effects. Hence, it is a peripherally selective drug.

== See also ==
- Alifedrine
- Prenalterol
