= Misoprostol =

Medication to induce abortion and treat ulcers

Clinical data
- Trade names: Cytotec, Misodel, others
- AHFS/Drugs.com: Monograph
- MedlinePlus: a689009
- License data: US DailyMed: Misoprostol
- Pregnancy category: AU: X (High risk); Used for terminating pregnancy
- Routes of administration: By mouth, rectal, intravaginal, sublingual
- ATC code: A02BB01 (WHO) G02AD06 (WHO)

Legal status
- Legal status: AU: S4 (Prescription only); BR: Class C1 (Other controlled substances) Hospital use only; CA: ℞-only; UK: POM (Prescription only); US: ℞-only; EU: Rx-only

Pharmacokinetic data
- Bioavailability: extensively absorbed
- Protein binding: 80–90% (active metabolite, misoprostol acid)
- Metabolism: Liver (extensive to misoprostic acid)
- Elimination half-life: 20–40 minutes
- Excretion: Urine (80%)

Identifiers
- IUPAC name: Methyl 7-((1R,2R,3R)-3-hydroxy-2-((S,E)-4-hydroxy-4-methyloct-1-enyl)-5-oxocyclopentyl)heptanoate
- CAS Number: 59122-46-2
- PubChem CID: 5282381
- IUPHAR/BPS: 1936
- DrugBank: DB00929
- ChemSpider: 4445541
- UNII: 0E43V0BB57
- KEGG: D00419
- ChEMBL: ChEMBL606
- CompTox Dashboard (EPA): DTXSID7020897
- ECHA InfoCard: 100.190.521

Chemical and physical data
- Formula: C_{22}H_{38}O_{5}
- Molar mass: 382.541 g·mol^{−1}
- 3D model (JSmol): Interactive image
- SMILES: CCCC[C@](C)(O)C/C=C/[C@H]1[C@H](O)CC(=O)[C@@H]1CCCCCCC(=O)OC
- InChI: InChI=1S/C22H38O5/c1-4-5-14-22(2,26)15-10-12-18-17(19(23)16-20(18)24)11-8-6-7-9-13-21(25)27-3/h10,12,17-18,20,24,26H,4-9,11,13-16H2,1-3H3/b12-10+/t17-,18-,20-,22?/m1/s1; Key:OJLOPKGSLYJEMD-URPKTTJQSA-N

Misoprostol is a synthetic prostaglandin medication used to prevent and treat stomach and duodenal ulcers, induce labor, cause an abortion, and treat postpartum bleeding due to poor contraction of the uterus. It is taken by mouth when used to prevent gastric ulcers in people taking nonsteroidal anti-inflammatory drugs (NSAID). For abortions it is typically used in conjunction with mifepristone or methotrexate, but can be used alone. By itself, effectiveness for abortion is between 82% and 100%. Its efficacy with mifepristone is higher, but varies based on gestational age. The misoprostol-only abortion regimen is typically recommended only when mifepristone is not available. For labor induction or abortion, it is taken by mouth, dissolved in the mouth, or placed in the vagina. For postpartum bleeding it may also be used rectally.

Common side effects include diarrhea and abdominal pain. It is in pregnancy category X, meaning that it is known to result in negative outcomes for the fetus if taken during pregnancy. In rare cases, uterine rupture may occur. It is a prostaglandin analogue—specifically, a synthetic prostaglandin E_{1} (PGE_{1}).

Misoprostol was developed in 1973 and first created for the treatment of gastric ulcers. Its first uses for abortion emerged in Latin America in the 1980s, as women noticed miscarriage was a side effect of the medication. It is on the World Health Organization's List of Essential Medicines. It is available as a generic medication.

== Medical uses ==
=== Ulcer prevention ===
Misoprostol is used for the prevention of NSAID-induced gastric ulcers. It acts upon gastric parietal cells, inhibiting the secretion of gastric acid by G-protein coupled receptor-mediated inhibition of adenylate cyclase, which leads to decreased intracellular cyclic AMP levels and decreased proton pump activity at the apical surface of the parietal cell. Misoprostol is sometimes coprescribed with NSAIDs to prevent their common adverse effect of gastric ulceration (e.g., with diclofenac in Arthrotec).

However, even in the treatment of NSAID-induced ulcers, omeprazole proved to be at least as effective as misoprostol, but was significantly better tolerated, so misoprostol is not considered a first-line treatment. Misoprostol-induced diarrhea and the need for multiple daily doses impairing treatment for gastric ulcers.

=== Labor induction ===
Misoprostol is commonly used for labor induction. It causes uterine contractions and the ripening (effacement or thinning) of the cervix. It can be less expensive than the other commonly used ripening agent, dinoprostone.

Oxytocin has long been used as the standard agent for labor induction, but does not work well when the cervix is not yet ripe. Misoprostol also may be used in conjunction with oxytocin.

Between 2002 and 2012, a misoprostol vaginal insert was studied, and was approved in the EU. It was not approved for use in the United States, and the US FDA still considers cervical ripening and labor induction to be outside of the approved uses for misoprostol. The vaginal and oral routes of misoprostol for labor induction are comparably effective, and are considered on a case-by-case basis by healthcare professionals.

=== Myomectomy ===
When administered prior to myomectomy in women with uterine fibroids, misoprostol reduces operative blood loss, requirement of blood transfusion, and operating time.

=== Abortion ===
Misoprostol is used either alone or in conjunction with another medication (mifepristone or methotrexate) for medical abortions as an alternative to surgical abortion. Misoprostol alone is typically only recommended when another medication is not available and is more effective when paired with mifepristone or methotrexate. Medical abortion has the advantage of being less invasive, and more autonomous, self-directed, and discreet. It is preferred by some women because it feels more natural, as the drugs induce a miscarriage. It is also more easily accessible in places where abortion is illegal. The World Health Organization (WHO) provides clear guidelines on the use, benefits and risks of misoprostol for abortions.

Misoprostol is most effective when it is used in combination with methotrexate or mifepristone (RU-486). Mifepristone blocks signaling by progesterone, causing the uterine lining to degrade, the blood vessels of the cervix and uterus to dilate and causing uterine contraction, similar to a menstrual period, which causes the embryo to detach from the uterine walls. Misoprostol then dilates the cervix and induces muscle contractions which clear the uterus. Misoprostol alone is less effective (typically 88% up to eight-weeks gestation). It is not inherently unsafe if medically supervised, but 1% of women will have heavy bleeding requiring medical attention, some women may have ectopic pregnancy, and the 12% of pregnancies that continue after misoprostol failure are more likely to have birth defects and are usually followed up with surgical intervention.

Most large studies recommend a protocol for the use of misoprostol in combination with mifepristone. Together they are effective in around 95% for early pregnancies. Misoprostol alone may be more effective in earlier gestation.

Misoprostol can also be used to dilate the cervix in preparation for a first-trimester surgical abortion (either alone or in combination with osmotic dilators), but is not routinely recommended.

Misoprostol by mouth is the least effective treatment for producing complete abortion in a period of 24 hours due to the liver's first-pass effect which reduces the bioavailability of the misoprostol. Vaginal and sublingual routes result in greater efficacy and extended duration of action because these routes of administration allow the drug to be directly absorbed into circulation by bypassing the liver first-pass effect.

Hematocrit or Hb tests and Rh testing are recommended before use for abortion confirmation of pregnancy. Following use, it is recommended that people attend a follow-up visit 2 weeks after treatment. If used for treatment of complete abortion, a pregnancy test, physical examination of the uterus, and ultrasound should be performed to ensure success of treatment. Surgical management is possible in the case of failed treatment.

=== Early pregnancy loss ===
Misoprostol may be used to complete a miscarriage or missed abortion when the body does not expel the embryo or fetus on its own. It can decrease the time to complete expulsion. Use of a single dose of misoprostol vaginally or buccally is preferred, with additional doses as needed. It also can be used in combination with mifepristone, with a similar regimen to medical abortion.

=== Postpartum bleeding ===
Misoprostol is also used to prevent and treat post-partum bleeding. Orally administered misoprostol is marginally less effective than oxytocin. Rectally administered misoprostol has been shown to be associated with lower rates of side effects compared to other routes. It is inexpensive and thermostable (not requiring refrigeration like oxytocin), making it a cost-effective and valuable drug to use in the developing world. A randomized control trial of misoprostol use found a 38% reduction in maternal deaths due to postpartum hemorrhage in resource-poor communities. Oxytocin must also be given by injection, while misprostol can be given orally or rectally for this use, making it much more useful in areas where nurses and physicians are less available.

=== Insertion of intrauterine contraceptive device ===
In women with prior caesarean section or prior failure of insertion of an intrauterine contraceptive device, pre-procedure administration of misoprostol reduces the rate of failure of insertion of intrauterine contraceptive device. However, due to a higher rate of adverse effects, routine use of misoprostol to dilate the cervix in preparation for intrauterine contraceptive device insertion in other cases is not recommended.

=== Other ===
Misoprostol is used for cervical ripening in advance of endometrial biopsy to reduce the need for use of a tenaculum or cervical dilator, but may be associated with increased pain and side effects during and after the procedure.

There is limited evidence supporting the use of misoprostol for the treatment of trigeminal neuralgia in patients with multiple sclerosis.

== Adverse effects ==
The most commonly reported adverse effect of taking misoprostol by mouth for the prevention of stomach ulcers is diarrhea. In clinical trials, an average 13% of people reported diarrhea, which was dose-related and usually developed early in the course of therapy (after 13 days) and was usually self-limiting (often resolving within 8 days), but sometimes (in 2% of people) required discontinuation of misoprostol.

The next most commonly reported adverse effects of taking misoprostol by mouth for the prevention of gastric ulcers are: abdominal pain, nausea, flatulence, headache, dyspepsia, vomiting, and constipation, but none of these adverse effects occurred more often than when taking placebos.

There are increased side effects with sublingual or oral misoprostol, compared to a low dose (400 μg) vaginal misoprostol. However, low dose vaginal misoprostol was linked with low complete abortion rate. The study concluded that sublingually administered misoprostol dosed at 600 μg or 400 μg had greater instances of fever and diarrhea due to its quicker onset of action, higher peak concentration and bioavailability in comparison to vaginal or oral misoprostol.

For the indication of medical abortion, bleeding and cramping is commonly experienced after administration of misoprostol. Bleeding and cramping is likely to be greater than that experienced with menses, however, emergency care is advised if bleeding is excessive.

Misoprostol should not be taken by pregnant women with wanted pregnancies to reduce the risk of NSAID-induced gastric ulcers because it increases uterine tone and contractions in pregnancy, which may cause partial or complete abortions, and because its use in pregnancy has been associated with birth defects.

All cervical ripening and induction agents can cause uterine hyperstimulation, which can negatively affect the blood supply to the fetus and increases the risk of complications such as uterine rupture. Concern has been raised that uterine hyperstimulation that occurs during a misoprostol-induced labor is more difficult to treat than hyperstimulation during labors induced by other drugs. Because the complications are rare, it is difficult to determine if misoprostol causes a higher risk than do other cervical ripening agents. One estimate is that it would require around 61,000 people enrolled in randomized controlled trials to detect a difference in serious fetal complications and about 155,000 people to detect a difference in serious maternal complications.

== Contraindications ==
It is recommended that medical treatment for missed abortion with misoprostol should only be considered in people without the following contraindications: suspected ectopic pregnancy, use of non-steroidal drugs, signs of pelvic infections or sepsis, unstable hemodynamics, known allergy to misoprostol, previous caesarean section, mitral stenosis, hypertension, glaucoma, bronchial asthma, and remote areas without a hospital nearby.

== Pharmacology ==
=== Mechanism of action ===
Misoprostol, a prostaglandin analogue, binds to myometrial cells to cause strong myometrial contractions leading to expulsion of tissue. This agent also causes cervical ripening with softening and dilation of the cervix. Misoprostol binds to and stimulates prostaglandin EP_{2} receptors, prostaglandin EP_{3} receptor and prostaglandin EP_{4} receptor but not prostaglandin EP_{1} receptor and therefore is expected to have a more restricted range of physiological and potentially toxic actions than prostaglandin E_{2} or other analogs which activate all four prostaglandin receptors.

== Society and culture ==
In August 2000, a letter from G.D. Searle, LLC, the inventor of the drug, generated controversy by warning against its use by pregnant women because of its ability to induce abortion, citing reports of maternal and fetal deaths when it was used to induce labor. The American College of Obstetricians and Gynecologists holds that substantial evidence supports the use of misoprostol for induction of labor, a position it reaffirmed in response to the Searle letter.

It is on the World Health Organization's List of Essential Medicines. In 2023, 63% of all abortions in the U.S. were non-surgical, using medications including misoprostol and mifepristone

A vaginal form of the medication is sold in the EU under the names Misodel and Mysodelle for use in labor induction.

=== Latin America ===
Misoprostol's use for abortion was discovered and developed by women in Brazil. It spread throughout Latin America, where abortion was generally illegal at the time.

In the 21st century, abortion has become legal in several countries in Latin America as part of the Green Wave, including Mexico, Argentina, and Uruguay. In Cuba, abortion has been legal since 1965.

=== Black market ===
Misoprostol is used for self-induced abortions in Latin America, where black market prices exceed US$100 per dose. Illegal medically unsupervised misoprostol abortions are associated with a lower complication rate than other forms of illegal self-induced abortion, but are still associated with a higher complication rate than legal, medically supervised surgical and medical abortion. Failed misoprostol abortions are associated with birth defects in some cases. Low-income and immigrant populations in New York City have also been observed to use self-administered misoprostol to induce abortions, as this method is much cheaper than a surgical abortion (about $2 per dose). The drug is readily available in Mexico. Use of misoprostol has also increased in Texas in response to increased regulation of abortion providers. Following the United States Supreme Court decision of Dobbs v. Jackson Women's Health Organization, many states restricted access to legal abortion services, including medication abortion using misoprostol. As a result of these restrictions, it was reported that there was an increase in self-managed abortions by women in the United States. Many women purchased the pills from overseas online pharmacies or obtained misoprostol from Mexico.
