= Cimaterol =

Chemical compound

Identifiers
- IUPAC name: 2-amino-5-[1-hydroxy-2-(propan-2-ylamino)ethyl]benzonitrile
- CAS Number: 54239-37-1
- PubChem CID: 2755
- ChemSpider: 2653
- UNII: ZPY8VRF0GB
- KEGG: D03502
- ChEBI: CHEBI:91807
- ChEMBL: ChEMBL1374751
- CompTox Dashboard (EPA): DTXSID2045652
- ECHA InfoCard: 100.160.786

Chemical and physical data
- Formula: C_{12}H_{17}N_{3}O
- Molar mass: 219.288 g·mol^{−1}
- 3D model (JSmol): Interactive image
- SMILES: CC(C)NCC(C1=CC(=C(C=C1)N)C#N)O
- InChI: InChI=1S/C12H17N3O/c1-8(2)15-7-12(16)9-3-4-11(14)10(5-9)6-13/h3-5,8,12,15-16H,7,14H2,1-2H3; Key:BUXRLJCGHZZYNE-UHFFFAOYSA-N

Cimaterol (INN) is a beta-adrenergic agonist.

== See also ==
- Dichloroisoprenaline
