= Tocolytic =

Drug used to suppress premature births

- Other names: Labor suppressant
- Specialty: Obstetrics and gynaecology

Tocolytics (also called anti-contraction medications or labor suppressants) are medications used to suppress premature labor (from Greek τόκος tókos, "childbirth", and λύσις lúsis, "loosening"). Preterm birth accounts for 70% of neonatal deaths. Therefore, tocolytic therapy is provided when delivery would result in premature birth, postponing delivery long enough for the administration of glucocorticoids (which accelerate fetal lung maturity) to be effective, as they may require one to two days to take effect.

Commonly used tocolytic medications include β_{2} agonists, calcium channel blockers, NSAIDs, and magnesium sulfate. These can assist in delaying preterm delivery by suppressing uterine muscle contractions and their use is intended to reduce fetal morbidity and mortality associated with preterm birth. The suppression of contractions is often only partial and tocolytics can only be relied on to delay birth for a matter of days. Depending on the tocolytic used, the pregnant woman or fetus may require monitoring (e.g., blood pressure monitoring when nifedipine is used as it reduces blood pressure; cardiotocography to assess fetal well-being). In any case, the risk of preterm labor alone justifies hospitalization.

== Indications ==
Tocolytics are used in preterm labor, which refers to when a baby is born too early before 37 weeks of pregnancy. As preterm birth represents one of the leading causes of neonatal morbidity and mortality, the goal is to prevent neonatal morbidity and mortality through delaying delivery and increasing gestational age by gaining more time for other management strategies like corticosteroids therapy that may help with fetus lung maturity. Tocolytics are considered for women with confirmed preterm labor between 24 and 34 weeks of gestation age and used in conjunction with other therapies that may include corticosteroids administration, fetus neuroprotection, and safe transfer to facilities.

== Types of agents ==
There is no clear first-line tocolytic agent. Current evidence suggests that first line treatment with β_{2} agonists, calcium channel blockers, or NSAIDs to prolong pregnancy for up to 48 hours is the best course of action to allow time for glucocorticoid administration.

Various types of agents are used, with varying success rates and side effects. Some medications are not specifically approved by the U.S. Food and Drug Administration (FDA) for use in stopping uterine contractions in preterm labor, instead being used off-label.

According to a 2022 Cochrane review, the most effective tocolytics for delaying preterm birth by 48 hours, and 7 days were the nitric oxide donors, calcium channel blockers, oxytocin receptor antagonists and combinations of tocolytics.

Drug	Mechanism of action	Description	Possible contraindications	Maternal side effects	Fetal and neonatal side effects
Terbutaline (Brethine)	β_{2} agonist	Off-label use, FDA has advised that injectable terbutaline should only be used in urgent situations, and that the oral form of the drug should never be used	Cardiac tachyarrhythmias, poorly controlled diabetes mellitus, hyperthyroidism, prolonged tocolysis(>48 to 72 hours)	Tachycardia, palpitations, hypotension, dyspnea, chest pain, hypokalemia, hyperglycemia, lipolysis, pulmonary edema, myocardial ischemia	Fetal tachycardia, hyperinsulinemia, hypoglycemia, myocardial and septal hypertrophy, myocardial ischemia
Ritodrine (Yutopar)	β_{2} agonist	No longer FDA approved	Poorly controlled thyroid disease, hypertension, and diabetes	Metabolic hyperglycemia, hyperinsulinemia, hypokalemia, antidiuresis, altered thyroid function, physiologic tremor, palpitations, nervousness, nausea or vomiting, fever, hallucinations	Neonatal tachycardia, hypoglycemia, hypocalcemia, hyperbilirubinemia, hypotension, intraventricular hemorrhage
Fenoterol	β_{2} agonist	Not approved for tocolysis by FDA	Diabetes, tachyarrhythmia, hypertrophic obstructive cardiomyopathy, hypersensitivity to fenoterol	Palpitations, tachycardia, and chest pain	Tachycardia, impaired carbohydrate tolerance, hyperinsulinaemia
Salbutamol (INN) or albuterol (USAN)	β_{2} agonist	Shown to be less effective than nifedipine for tocolysis regarding neonatal outcome	Diabetes, ischemic cardiopathy, cardiac arrhythmia, placenta praevia, hyperthyroidism, hypersensitivity to salbutamol (albuterol)	Headache, palpitations, tachycardia, tremor, sweating, and shortness of breath	Fetal tachycardia, hypoglycemia, hyperinsulinaemia
Hexoprenaline (Gynipral)	β_{2} agonist	Not FDA approved	Hyperthyroidism, cardiovascular diseases, glaucoma, placental abruption, vaginal bleeding, inflammatory diseases of internal genitalia, 1st trimester of pregnancy, breastfeeding	Vertigo, anxiety, tremor, hyperhidrosis, tachycardia, hypotension, hyperglycemia, edema	Hypoglycemia, bronchospasm, anaphylactic shock
Nifedipine (Procardia, Adalat)	Ca^{2+} channel blocker	Is one of the most commonly used tocolytic agents.	Hypotension, preload-dependent cardiac disease. It should not be used concomitantly with magnesium sulfate	Flushing, headache, dizziness, nausea, transient hypotension. Administration of calcium channel blockers should be used with care in patients with renal disease and hypotension. Concomitant use of calcium channel blockers and magnesium sulfate may result in cardiovascular collapse	Calcium channel blockers have the fewest neonatal adverse effects
Atosiban	Oxytocin receptor antagonist	Safer than both nifedipine and beta agonists; As effective as nifedipine and more effective than beta agonists. Fewer side effects than β_{2} agonists. Although not FDA approved in the US, atosiban was developed specifically to delay preterm labor.	No current contraindications	No maternal adverse effects	No adverse effects to the baseline fetal heart rate. No significant difference in neonatal side effect compared to other treatments
Indomethacin	NSAID	Shown to effectively delay premature birth, studies show that it is safer and more effective for pregnant women that are <= 32 weeks of gestation	Late pregnancy (ductus arteriosus), significant renal or hepatic impairment	Nausea, heartburn	Constriction of ductus arteriosus, pulmonary hypertension, reversible decrease in renal function with oligohydramnios, intraventricular hemorrhage, hyperbilirubinemia, necrotizing enterocolitis
Sulindac	NSAID	Studies show that it has similar efficacy to that of indomethacin and has a milder effect on the fetal ductus arteriousus	Coagulation disorders or thrombocytopenia, NSAID-sensitive asthma, other sensitivity to NSAID	GI complications such as nausea, vomiting and stomach pain due to COX inhibition	NSAIDs have been shown to be associated with constriction of the ductus arteriousus and oligohydramnios
Magnesium sulfate	Myosin light chain inhibitor	Probably effective in delaying preterm birth by 48 hours. It is used for its neuro-protective effects since it is shown to decrease the risk of cerebral palsy in infants.	Absolute contraindication: myasthenia gravis. Use as a tocolytic agent may result in death of the fetus or infant.	Flushing, lethargy, headache, muscle weakness, diplopia, dry mouth, pulmonary edema, cardiac arrest	Lethargy, hypotonia, respiratory depression, demineralization with prolonged use
Ethanol	GABA_{A} receptor PAM	Shown to be ineffective: no better than placebo.Source revision needed Was a frequently used tocolytic in the mid-20th century, but later double-blind studies found it was not effective.	Pregnancy: no amount of ethanol is safe to the fetus	Intoxication, withdrawal	Fetal alcohol syndrome: ethanol is a teratogen and can harm fetus

Calcium-channel blockers (such as nifedipine) and oxytocin antagonists (such as atosiban) may delay delivery by 2 to 7 days, depending on how quickly the medication is administered. NSAIDs (such as indomethacin) and calcium channel blockers (such as nifedipine) are the most likely to delay delivery for 48 hours, with the least amount of maternal and neonatal side effects. Otherwise, tocolysis is rarely successful beyond 24 to 48 hours because current medications do not alter the fundamentals of labor activation. However, postponing premature delivery by 48 hours appears sufficient to allow pregnant women to be transferred to a center specialized for management of preterm deliveries, and thus administer corticosteroids for the possibility to reduce neonatal organ immaturity.

The efficacy of β-adrenergic agonists, atosiban, and indomethacin is a decreased odds ratio (OR) of delivery within 24 hours of 0.54 (95% confidence interval (CI): 0.32-0.91) and 0.47 within 48 hours (OR 0.47, 95% CI: 0.30-0.75).

Antibiotics were thought to delay delivery, but no studies have shown any evidence that using antibiotics during preterm labor effectively delays delivery or reduces neonatal morbidity. Antibiotics are used in people with premature rupture of membranes, but this is not characterized as tocolysis.

== Contraindications to tocolytics ==
In addition to drug-specific contraindications, several general factors may contraindicate delaying childbirth with the use of tocolytic medications.

- Fetus is older than 34 weeks gestation
- Fetus weighs less than 2.5 kg, or has intrauterine growth restriction (IUGR) or placental insufficiency
- Lethal congenital or chromosomal abnormalities
- Cervical dilation is greater than 4 centimeters
- Chorioamnionitis or intrauterine infection is present
- Pregnant woman has severe pregnancy-induced hypertension, severe eclampsia/preeclampsia, active vaginal bleeding, placental abruption, a cardiac disease, or another condition which indicates that the pregnancy should not continue.
- Maternal hemodynamic instability with bleeding
- Intrauterine fetal demise, lethal fetal anomaly, or non-reassuring fetal status

== Future direction of tocolytics ==
Most tocolytics are currently being used off-label. The future direction of the development of tocolytics agents should be directed toward better efficacy in intentionally prolonging pregnancy. This will potentially result in less maternal, fetal, and neonatal adverse effects when delaying preterm childbirth. A few tocolytic alternatives worth pursuing include Barusiban, a last generation of oxytocin receptor antagonists, as well as COX-2 inhibitors. More studies on the use of multiple tocolytics must be directed to research overall health outcomes rather than solely pregnancy prolongation.

== See also ==
- Labor induction
