= Hexoprenaline =

Chemical compound

Clinical data
- Pronunciation: /ˌhɛksoʊˈprɛnəliːn/ HEKS-oh-PREN-ə-leen
- Other names: 4-[2-[6-[[2-(3,4-dihydroxyphenyl)-2-hydroxyethyl]amino]hexylamino]-1-hydroxyethyl]benzene-1,2-diol
- AHFS/Drugs.com: International Drug Names
- Routes of administration: Oral (tablets), IV
- ATC code: R03AC06 (WHO) R03CC05 (WHO)

Legal status
- Legal status: AU: S4 (Prescription only); In general: ℞ (Prescription only)

Pharmacokinetic data
- Bioavailability: 5–11% (T_{max} = 2 hours)
- Metabolism: COMT (slow O-methylation)
- Elimination half-life: ~50 minutes (if taken orally)
- Excretion: Feces (~90%)

Identifiers
- IUPAC name: (±)-4,4'-{Hexane-1,6-diylbis[imino(1-hydroxyethane-2,1-diyl)]}dibenzene-1,2-diol
- CAS Number: 3215-70-1
- PubChem CID: 3609
- DrugBank: DB08957
- ChemSpider: 3483
- UNII: G9L6B3W684
- KEGG: D08039
- CompTox Dashboard (EPA): DTXSID7048322

Chemical and physical data
- Formula: C_{22}H_{32}N_{2}O_{6}
- Molar mass: 420.506 g·mol^{−1}
- 3D model (JSmol): Interactive image
- Chirality: Racemic mixture
- SMILES: C1=CC(=C(C=C1C(CNCCCCCCNCC(C2=CC(=C(C=C2)O)O)O)O)O)O
- InChI: InChI=1S/C22H32N2O6/c25-17-7-5-15(11-19(17)27)21(29)13-23-9-3-1-2-4-10-24-14-22(30)16-6-8-18(26)20(28)12-16/h5-8,11-12,21-30H,1-4,9-10,13-14H2; Key:OXLZNBCNGJWPRV-UHFFFAOYSA-N

Hexoprenaline is a selective β_{2} adrenergic receptor agonist used in the treatment of asthma. Hexoprenaline is also used in some countries (such as Russia and Switzerland) as a tocolytic agent (i.e., labor suppressant), with the most common trade name being Gynipral. It is not approved by the United States Food and Drug Administration.

== Contraindications ==
When used as a tocolytic, hexoprenaline is contraindicated in:

- Hyperthyroidism
- Cardiovascular diseases, e.g. cardiac arrhythmias, tachycardia, myocarditis, mitral valve disease and aortic stenosis
- Ischemic heart disease
- Hypertension
- Angle-closure glaucoma
- Placental abruption, vaginal bleeding and inflammatory diseases of internal genitalia (such as endometritis)
- Shock
- First trimester of pregnancy
- Breastfeeding

It should be used with caution in people with gestational diabetes.

== Drug-drug interactions ==
When concomitantly administered:

- Beta blockers reduce or neutralize therapeutic effects of hexoprenaline
- Methylxanthines (caffeine, theobromine, theophylline) increase its action
- General anaesthetics (e.g., halothane) and adrenergic receptor agonists may increase the risk of cardiovascular side effects, such as arrhythmia

Hexoprenaline is contraindicated for use with monoamine oxidase inhibitors (MAOIs), tricyclic antidepressant (TCAs), ergot alkaloids, and dihydrotachysterol.
